= Cinema of Togo =

Cinema in Togo began with German colonial filmmakers visiting Togoland. The French attempted to suppress cinema in French Togoland. After the Togolese Republic gained independence in 1960, Togo's national government encouraged cinema, though government support for cinema lapsed when French funding was withdrawn in the 1990s. More recently, however, the film industry is once again growing in Togo.

== Cinema in the colonial period ==
The amateur filmmaker Carl Müller filmed Lomé in 1906, touring Germany with his films on his return. More systematic encouragement to colonial filming of Togoland was provided by the explorer Adolf Friedrich, colonial governor of Togoland from 1912 to 1914. Wilhelm Solf's 1913 visit to the colony was filmed and distributed in Europe. Hans Schomburgk first visited Togo in 1913–14, working with the British cameraman James S. Hodgson and the actress Meg Gehrts. Though the outbreak of World War I led to most of their material being confiscated and lost, Schomburgk had enough material to release a series of short films in 1916–17. Schomburgk's Im Deutschen Sudan (In the German Sudan) was a feature-length 1917 documentary, used for colonial propaganda.

French colonial law did not initially regulate film production and distribution. In 1932 the French colonial administrator Robert de Guise complained that Africans in French Togoland, such as Albert John Mensah in Lomé, were turning their homes and businesses into illicit cinemas. As a result, the Laval Decree established censorship to control the authorship, content and distribution of films.

== Cinema post-independence ==
The 1970s were "a great period for Togolese cinema", according to cultural administrator Komi Ati: the post-independence government encouraged cinema, establishing the Service du Cinéma et des Actualités Audiovisuelles (CINEATO) in 1976 to make newsreels and documentaries. However, Togolese cinema suffered a setback in 1993, when the Organisation internationale de la Francophonie withdrew all their funding for ten years. Cinemas and distribution companies closed down.

== Contemporary growth ==
The Togolese film sector is relatively small and undeveloped, and struggles with postcolonial dilemmas of representation. However, it has recently started to grow in self-confidence. Anne-Laure Folly, making documentaries since the early 1990s, is a Togolese filmmaker who has gained an international reputation. In 2009 Christelle Aquéréburu established ECRAN, a film school in Togo which has taught over 100 students and produced 20 films and documentaries. The work of one ECRAN student, Essi Névamé Akpandza, was nominated in the School Films category at the 2013 FESPACO. A new film and animated code has been established to boost the film industry in Togo. In 2018 the Togolese Minister of Culture, Guy Madje Lorenzo, opened a government-sponsored cinema week, screening over sixty films and organizing a scriptwriting residency. New filmmakers include Gilbert Bararmna and the award-winning Joël Tchédré.
