= List of conflicts in Togo =

Location of Togo (dark blue)

== Late Modern Period ==
- 1764 Battle of Atakpamé

== Contemporary History ==
- July 28, 1914 — November 11, 1918 World War I
  - August 3, 1914 — November 23, 1918 African theatre of World War I
    - August 9, 1914 — August 26, 1914 Togoland Campaign
      - August 15, 1914 Battle of Agbeluvhoe
      - August 22, 1914 Battle of Chra
- January 13, 1963 Togolese coup d'état

== See also ==
- Military of Togo
- Togolese Army
- Togolese Navy
- Togolese Air Force
- Military history of Africa
- African military systems to 1,800 C.E.
- African military systems 1,800 C.E. — 1,900 C.E.
- African military systems after 1,900 C.E.
