= Affair of Khra =

1914 conflict between Anglo-French and German colonial forces

- Part of the Togoland Campaign of the First World War
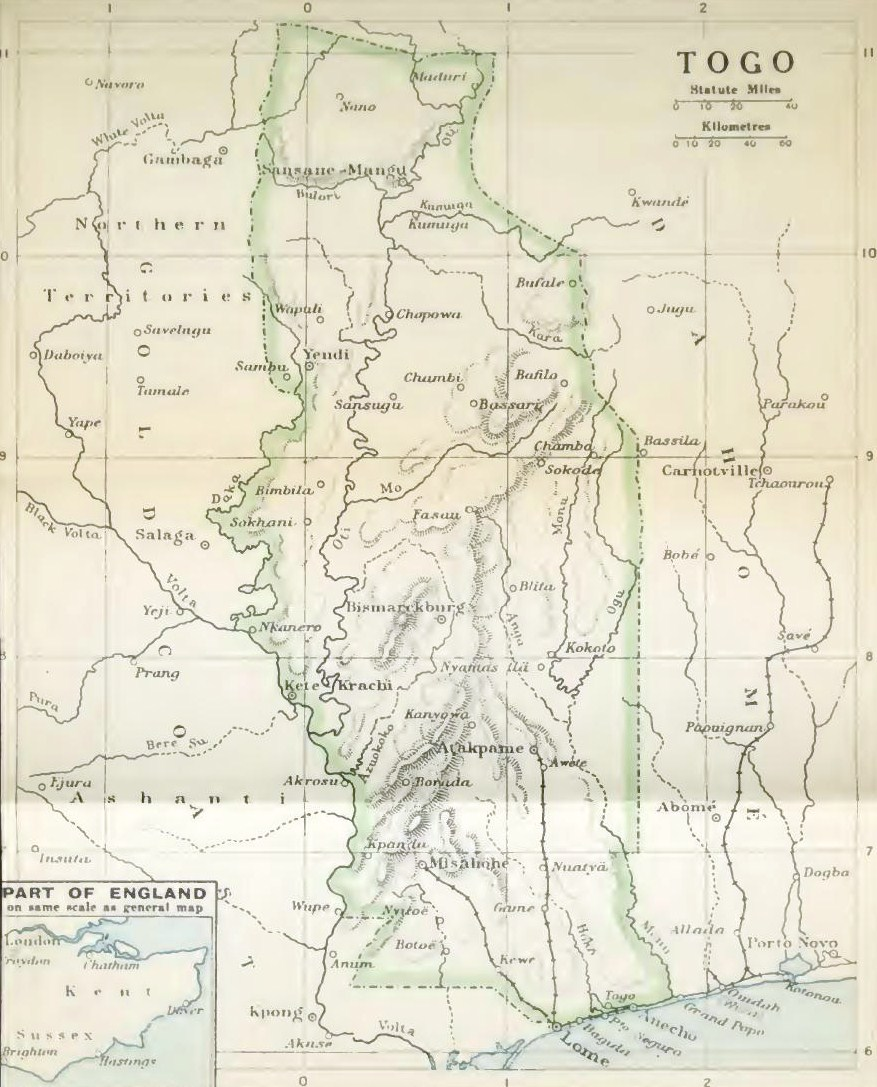
- Map of Togoland, 1914
Date	22 August 1914
Location	River Khra (Chra), German Togoland 7°10.24′N 1°09.52′E
Result	Allied victory

Belligerents
British Empire: (Gold Coast (British colony)) Gold Coast; France: (French Third Republic) French Dahomey	(German Empire) Germany: Togoland

Commanders and leaders
Frederick Bryant; A. F. Redfern; H. S. Collins; R. Castaing	(German Empire) Hans Georg von Doering (surrendered)

Units involved
Gold Coast Regiment; Tirailleurs Sénégalais	Paramilitary and police forces

Strength
British: 300; France: 158	German Empire: 460–560

Casualties and losses
Britain 31; France: 44	German Empire: 13
- Location within Togo Affair of Khra (Africa)

The Affair of Khra [Chra] ("affair" a military engagement by a force less than a division) was fought by British and French troops against German Polizeitruppen(paramilitary police) in the village of Khra, near the Khra River on 22 August 1914, during the Togoland Campaign of the First World War. (Note: Affair, an action or engagement not of sufficient magnitude to be called a battle. The British Battles Nomenclature Committee Report of 1922 defined a battle as an engagement by a corps or more, an action was by a division and an affair by a force less than a division.) The German defenders mined the approaches to the river, blew the bridges and dug in around the village on the far bank, ready to defend the crossing with rifles and three concealed machine-guns. The British–French attack was repulsed and then a German counter-attack was ordered but many troops refused the order and the attack was not delivered.

The Germans retired overnight to Kamina, due to apprehension that other British and French troops would cut off the German retreat and overestimation of the number of their opponents. The invaders paused for two days and resumed the advance on Kamina; they were met at Glei, on 25 August, by two Germans who offered terms of surrender. The British commander demanded unconditional surrender and the Germans accepted his terms the next day, ending hostilities. The colony was administered jointly for the duration of the war by the French and British. After the war Togoland was partitioned, the western part of Togoland, administered by the British, joined Ghana in 1957 and French Togoland became independent as Togo in 1960.

== Background ==
=== Strategic developments ===
An Offensive Sub-Committee of the Committee of Imperial Defence which had been appointed on 5 August established a principle that command of the seas was to be ensured. Objectives were to be considered if they could be attained by local forces and if the objective assisted the priority of maintaining British sea communications, as British army garrisons abroad were returned to Europe in an "Imperial Concentration". Attacks on German coaling stations and wireless stations were considered to be important to clear the seas of German commerce raiders.

Objectives at Tsingtau in the Far East and Luderitz Bay (Angra Pequena), Windhoek, Duala and Dar es Salaam in Africa, were considered feasible and a German wireless station in Togoland, next to the British colony of Gold Coast (now Ghana) in the Gulf of Guinea, was judged to be within the capacity of local forces. The high-power wireless transmitter had been built at Kamina and controlled German wireless communication in the Atlantic Ocean, by linking a German transmitter at Nauen near Berlin with German colonies in west Africa and South America.

At the outbreak of war, the German acting-Governor of Togoland, Major Hans Georg von Doering, who had 152 paramilitary police, 416 local police and 125 border guards but no regular army forces, had proposed neutrality to the British and French colonial authorities, under the Congo Act 1885. The Germans had withdrawn from Lomé and the coastal region, when the British demanded unconditional surrender.

Doering, in the absence of the Governor Duke Adolf Friedrich of Mecklenburg, had sent an un-coded wireless message to Berlin disclosing his plan to retreat to Kamina, which had been intercepted and led to British offensive operations against Kamina being authorised by the Colonial Office on 9 August. Expeditions from northern Dahomey, Nigeria and the Gold Coast began on 12 August.

=== Tactical developments ===
British forces, under the command of Lieutenant-Colonel F. C. Bryant, from the Gold Coast, a colony to the west of Togoland and French forces from the colony of French Dahomey to the east, invaded Togoland. Late on 6 August, French police occupied customs posts near Athiémè and the village of Agbanake was occupied late on 7 August. The Mono River was crossed and Aného was captured early on 8 August. About 460 German colonists and Askaris retreated inland, impressing civilians and calling up reservists as they moved north. The French advanced to Porto Seguro and Togo, before stopping the advance when Lomé, the Togoland capital, was surrendered to British forces. The British had sent two officers to Lomé on 6 August with a demand to surrender the colony within 24 hours and invaded Togoland late on 7 August. The Germans left for Kamina and surrendered Togoland up to the Khra River, 75 mi (120 km) inland, to prevent a naval bombardment of Lomé.

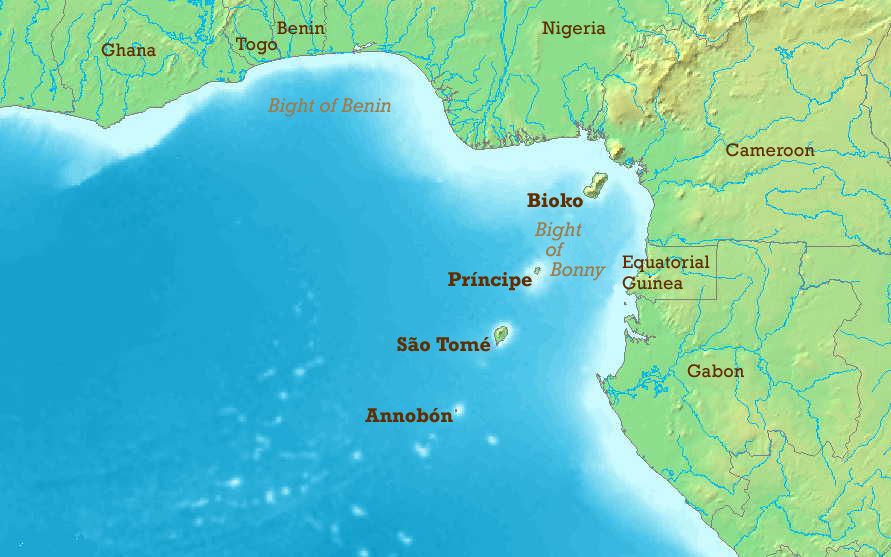
Gulf of Guinea, showing the location of Togo and the modern states of Ghana and Benin (formerly Dahomey)

By 12 August, the Togo coast and Lomé had been occupied, with little resistance from the Germans who had withdrawn to Kamina, 100 mi (160 km) inland, on hills near Atakpamé. A wireless station had been built at the village for communication between Germany and its African colonies, South America and German shipping in the Atlantic. The only routes inland were by the railway and road, which had been built through dense and almost impassable jungle. The Anglo-French advance towards Kamina was slowed by German demolitions of railway bridges, which made movement difficult and delayed the transport of supplies. Captain Georg Pfähler, the German military commander, travelled south on two trains with 200 soldiers, towards the main Entente columns. The Germans were ambushed and defeated at the Affair of Agbeluvoe on 15 August and Pfähler was killed. The Germans had many casualties and fled, leaving 30 mi (48 km) of railway to the north intact. On 17 August, the British force was joined by 150 French Tirailleurs Sénégalais under Captaine Castaing.

== Prelude ==
=== Peripheral operations ===
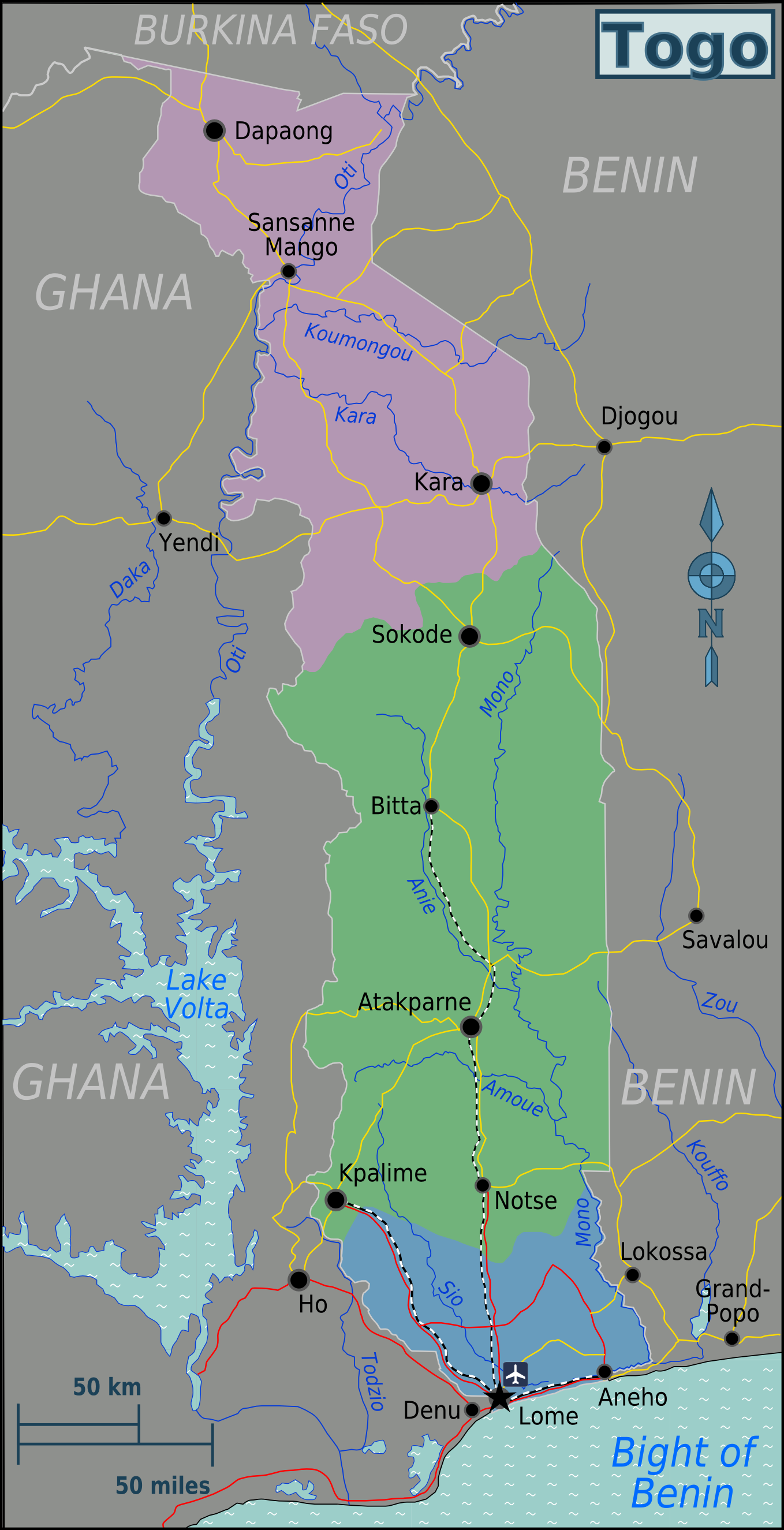
Togo Regions map showing rail communications extant in 1914

On 4 and 5 August, in the north of the Gold Coast colony, two twenty-man detachments of Northern Territories Constabulary, advanced from Tamale to Zan on the frontier. Due to a misunderstanding, orders from Bryant for a company of the Gold Coast Regiment already in Zan, to occupy Krachi had also been obeyed by the Constabulary. Tamale was left undefended and was feared vulnerable to attack by about 250 German troops, who were known to have left Sansane Mangu, heading south. The Chief Commissioner of the Northern Territories had also heard that the German Commissioner was still at Yende. Orders were dispatched to the Constabulary to return to Zan and the Commandant of the Constabulary, Major J. Marlowe, was ordered to take all the trained men left at Tamale and advance on Yende, if agent reports were favourable. Marlowe advanced on 12 August and occupied Yende unopposed on 14 August, where it was found that the Germans had learned through their agents, that the Constabulary had left Tamale, had assumed that their arrival at Yende was imminent and left the next day.

More small detachments of the Constabulary, amounting to 139 men, invaded northern Togoland at various points. Further south 48 men of the Gold Coast Service occupied Ho unopposed on 17 August. Bryant ordered the detachments at Lomé and Ho to move to Palime to guard the flank of the main force, advancing from the south. Two Preventive Service officers used a motor cycle to drive about 30 mi (48 km) from Lomé and cut the Lomé–Palime railway line. The Germans in Palime retired soon afterwards and blew up the road and rail bridges at Agu. By 18 August, the railway bridge at Togblekove had been repaired. In the north of Togoland, British and French troops, police and volunteers invaded and reached Yendi and Sansane Mangu by 14 August.

A small French force invaded Togoland from north-west French Dahomey on 9 August and four days later met and skirmished with the German defenders in the districts of Sansane-Mangu and Skode-Balfilo; the French company retreated after finding German resistance greater than expected. More detachments followed, c. 200 Togolese troops in the area deserted, many of the rest retreated and the local civilian authorities hurried to repudiate German allegiance. M. Duranthon advanced from Fada Ngurma with about 140 police and volunteers, was followed by M. Arboussier with a force of c. 120 volunteers and police from Ouagadougou and Captitaine Bouchez with about 130 soldiers of the 2nd Tirailleurs Sénégalais. Arbroussier reached Sansane Mangu on 23 August and Bouchez on 26 August, having covered 372 mi (599 km) in twenty days. A British column of 104 men from Gambaga arrived at Sansane Mangu on 18 August and c. 400 French police and volunteers occupied other places in northern Togoland, having crossed difficult country, little known to the colonial occupiers.

=== Entente preparations ===
Bryant began the main advance on 19 August and notified Major Maroix, the commander of a French force at Cheti and Captain P. E. L. Elgee, in command of the Krachi column, that he expected to reach the river Amuchu on 26 August. Bryant desired them to be within two days' march of Kamina by then. Bryant sent the messages by runner, in the belief that local civilians were hostile to the German colonialists, who had on occasion, coerced civilians with death threats, to oppose the British and French. Local civilians had been willing to assist the British and French as soon as they invaded the colony. Maroix had 368 French and Sénégalais troops and reservists, supported by a section of artillery. Having concentrated at Cheti on 19 August, the French began to advance on Kamina on 22 August. The Krachi Column, with A, B and F companies of the Gold Coast Regiment, had arrived from 16 to 18 August, using canoes to cross the Volta. The column departed Kete Krachi along the Kpandu road on 19 August.

The Affair of Agbeluvoe was considered a great defeat of the Germans by local civilians but it delayed briefly the British advance to the north, until 19 August. The German force of one German and seven local companies of c. 1,500 men had been expected to be most formidable, given the Togolese terrain. The Germans were not able to obtain information about the British in the neighbouring colony of Gold Coast (now Ghana) and instructions by wireless from Berlin, merely insisted that the transmitting station be protected. In the first three weeks of August, the transmitter at Kamina had passed 229 messages from Nauen in Germany to German colonies and German shipping. Scouts under Captain A. F. Redfern arrived near the southern bank of the Khra River on 21 August. The Germans blew the bridge and detonated two mines in the path of the scouts, who were then engaged by fire from two machine-guns. The patrol was able to survey the German defences and retire unharmed to report the German entrenchments around the village, 500 yd (460 m) north of the bridge, to Bryant.

=== Entente plan ===
Dense bush made an attack difficult, because observation beyond a few yards was impossible, making it difficult to maintain direction, provide mutual support or to gain a sufficient field of fire for supporting machine-guns, which would also be limited by the difficulty of transporting ammunition. Bryant decided on an attack from two directions, preceded by a screen of skirmishers. On the right near the railway, the Pioneer and part of G Company of the Gold Coast Regiment and Castaing's French detachment were to advance around the left flank, while the Pioneer Company was to pin down the Germans frontally. Half of C Company, I Company and three guns of the Gold Coast Regiment were to advance around the right flank, while half of C Company pinned down the Germans opposite, the guns giving such support as they could. The half of G Company attacking near the railway was reinforced by seventeen of the French Sénégalais soldiers for the attack.

=== German preparations ===
The road and railway ran north through Khra, which the Germans chose as the point to make a stand in defence of Kamina further north. Khra lay west of the railway, on either side of the road and was about 150 yd (140 m) wide and 400 yd (370 m) long. The railway from Khra to Kamina remained open to carry supplies and reinforcements to the German force of c. 440 troops, which had three days to dig in, before Allied forces arrived from the south on 21 August. Entrenchments were dug around the fringe of the village and eastwards to a nearby railway cutting; three or four machine-guns were dug in on the flanks, to command all approaches of attack and the road and railway bridges, which were about 500 yd (460 m) south of Khra were mined.

== Engagement ==
G Company and the party of Tirailleurs Sénégalais worked through the bush on the German left flank until about 11:00 a.m., when they were stopped by rifle and machine-gun fire from entrenched German troops. Both sides exchanged fire until 3:30 p.m., when Lieutenant G. M. Thompson considered that a superiority of fire had been achieved and ordered the attack. German small-arms fire increased and the attack was stopped 50 yd (46 m) from the German entrenchments, Thompson, Maroix and many of the soldiers having been killed or wounded; the survivors retired. (Note: All but one of the Tirailleurs Sénégalais became a casualty; the twelve dead were later found around Thompson's body and all were buried together.) On the left flank, I Company made its way around the German right flank against much small-arms fire but found more trenches and lacked the number of men necessary to risk an attack. When dark fell, the party withdrew and dug in along the riverbed about 300 yd (270 m) west of the village. Two of the British guns had been brought into action from a range of 1,300 yd (1,200 m) but lack of view made the result impossible to know. (Note: The first shell went through a tree which the Germans had been using as a vantage point and was promptly abandoned.)

The German forces were ordered to counter-attack but many men refused or deserted. The three German machine-guns had fired many thousands of rounds from camouflaged positions and had been the foundation of German defensive fire power. At first the Germans had been apprehensive of the British gunfire but found that their return fire held back their opponents. The attack on the German left flank obtained surprise but the fortuitous arrival of a third company of German reinforcements by train from Kamina enabled the attack to be repulsed. The order to retire was given overnight and was unwelcome, because the defenders believed that they could delay the Allies for much longer, given the strength of the position and casualties of only thirteen men. The British troops found the experience of facing machine-gun fire demoralising and the British machine-guns had been much less effective. During the night Bryant prepared to resume the attack at dawn, by ordering the troops on the right to dig in and by reinforcing I Company on the left flank.

== Aftermath ==
=== Analysis ===
Bryant was surprised by the sudden German retreat, having estimated the German force to be 460 men and three machine-guns and assumed that the defenders had tried to forestall the cutting of their retreat by a wider flanking movement or that the French advance from Cheti had been discovered and the Germans had chosen to concentrate at Kamina. A storm had cut telegraph communications with Accra for three days and unknown to Bryant, British signallers eavesdropping on German wireless communications had learned that they had destroyed their ciphers, which suggested that they considered the situation desperate. The Germans had amassed one colonial and eight Togolese companies, which had been expected to be much more formidable and to fight in the entrenchments and dug-outs around Kamina.

The German intelligence system had broken down when the war began and no news had been brought from the Gold Coast, due to lack of co-operation from Togolese civilians. (Note: Hostility to the German colonialists was not universal; after they had announced to the local police and other staff that they would return in six months, several men travelled to Lomé in February 1915, to inquire as to where they were.) Communication with Berlin resulted only in exhortations to protect the wireless at Kamina. The speed of the Allied invasion, the German overestimation of the numbers involved and the hostility of local civilians, proved to be insuperable obstacles. A German account noted that many of the Germans were untrained, that the defences of Kamina were too widespread for the German force adequately to garrison and were overlooked by nearby hills. The British had been helped by the quick action of the French civilian and military authorities, the endurance of the troops and the assistance from civilians in the Gold Coast.

=== Casualties ===
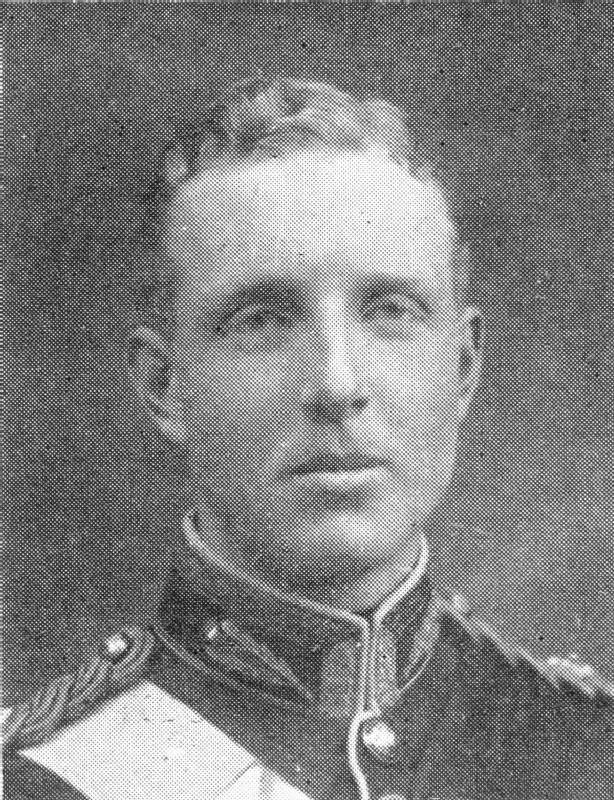
Lt Thompson was the first British officer to be killed in action during the First World War. Lt Thompson is buried at Wahala Cemetery near Atakpame

About 450 British and other Entente troops were engaged and had 75 casualties, c. 17 per cent of the force. A British and one French officer were killed along with five British and sixteen French, other ranks. Two British officers, a French NCO, 23 British and twenty French were wounded, along with six carriers. Thirteen German casualties were suffered.

=== Subsequent operations ===
The British sent out patrols to Glei and the River Amu to check on reports that the Germans had stopped their retirement. The main force stayed at Khra from 23 to 24 August to bring up supplies and to return the wounded to Lomé, once the railway had been repaired and an ambulance train had been improvised by civilian officials. Few of the casualties were suffering from sickness, despite living in wet clothes due to the climate. Bryant expected that the Germans would make their main defensive stand at Kamina and ordered the Krachi Column to leave the territory around Palime to the Preventive Service detachments and move along the Palime railway to Lomé to join the main force. On the night of 24/25 August, explosions were heard from Kamina and next day the wireless masts, which were usually visible from Glei could not be seen. The main force advanced and reached Glei by 10:30 a.m., scouts reached the Amu river and found that the Germans had blown the road and rail bridges. At 4:00 p.m., Major von Roebern and an interpreter entered Glei under a flag of truce, to submit terms of capitulation. Bryant demanded unconditional surrender and ordered the force to cross the river and advance to Amuchu but the river flooded during the night and the column did not complete the crossing until 26 August.

Bryant reached Amuchu with an advanced guard at 10:30 a.m. also on 26 August and was met by two German officers bearing an unconditional surrender. A civilian volunteer, Mr. Newlands, went to Kamina to arrange the details of the surrender and found that the transmitter had been demolished and burned. The pause of the Allied advance at Khra had given the Germans time to relay more messages between Germany and the colonies and then Von Doering had ordered that the wireless station be destroyed, before surrendering his 200 remaining troops, three machine-guns, more than 1,000 rifles and c. 320,000 rounds of ammunition. The Krachi Column advanced through Ahenkro and Liati to reach Palime on 23 August and was joined by a civilian, Mr. Beckley with messages from Bryant. The column had been unopposed, despite the terrain containing many features at which small forces could delay a larger one. The roads had been in good repair and supplies had been obtained locally, from civilians who had been welcoming. The French column under Maroix, advanced from Cheti and met minor opposition from 22 to 23 August, before it entered Kamina on 27 August.
