= List of colonial governors of Togo =

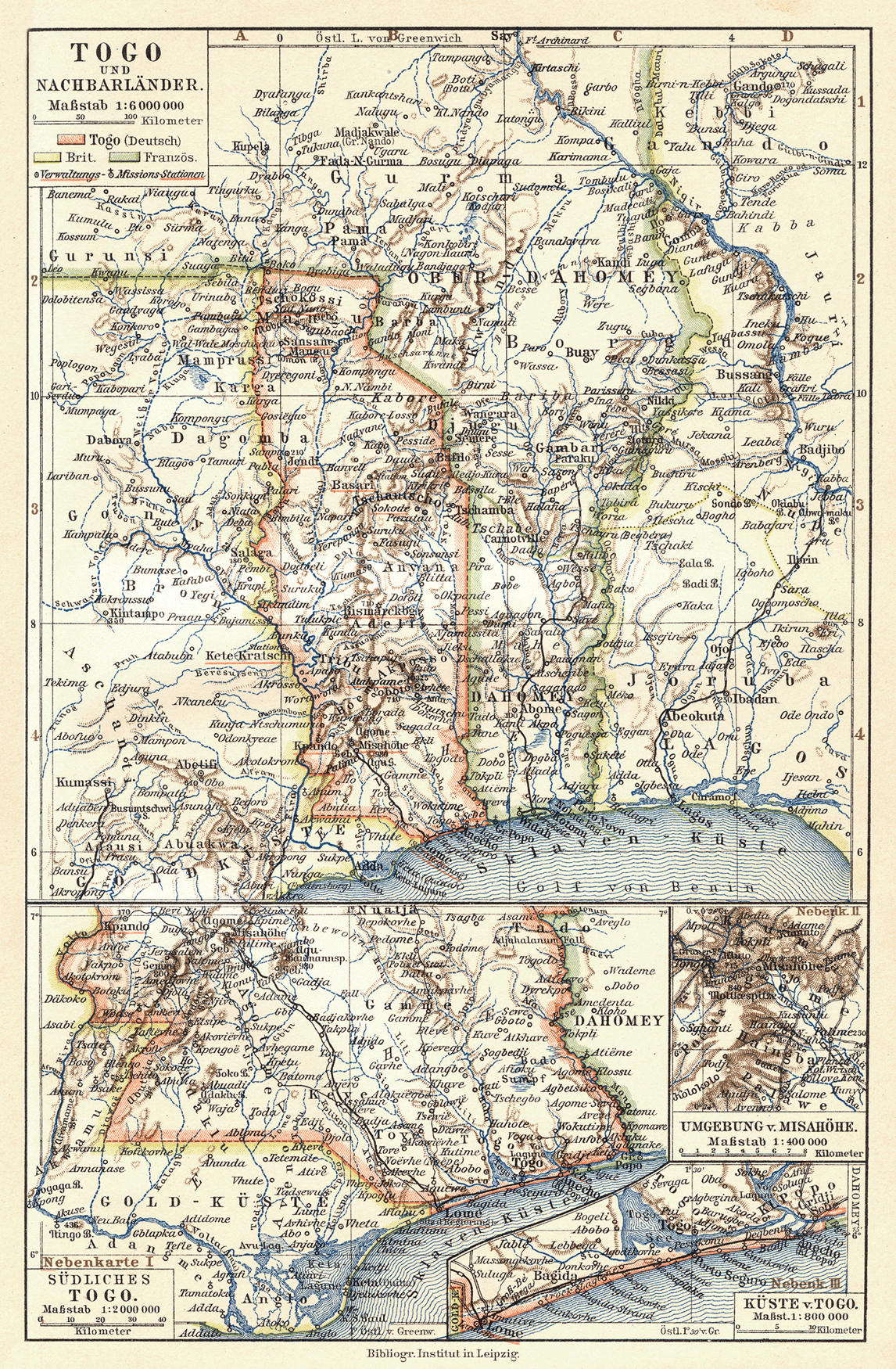
Togoland (bordered in red), 1905.

French Togoland (pale purple) and British Togoland (pale green).

This article lists the colonial governors of Togo. It encompasses the period when the country was under colonial rule of the German Empire (as Togoland), military occupation of the territory by the Allies of World War I (during the Togoland campaign of the African theatre), as well as the period when it was a Class B League of Nations mandate and a United Nations trust territory, under the administration of France (as French Togoland) and the United Kingdom (as British Togoland) respectively.

== List ==
(Dates in italics indicate de facto continuation of office)

=== German Togoland ===
Tenure	Portrait	Incumbent	Notes
5 July 1884 to 6 July 1884		Gustav Nachtigal, Kommissar	Commissioner; Reichskommissar (Reich Commissioner) for German West Africa
6 July 1884 to 26 June 1885		Heinrich Randad, Provisional Consul	
26 June 1885 to May 1887		Ernst Falkenthal, Kommissar	Commissioner
July 1887 to 17 October 1888		Jesko von Puttkamer, acting Kommissar	acting Commissioner, 1st time
17 October 1888 to 14 April 1891		Eugen von Zimmerer, Kommissar	Commissioner
14 April 1891 to 4 June 1892		Markus Graf von Pfeil, acting Kommissar	acting Commissioner
4 June 1892 to 17 November 1893		Jesko von Puttkamer, Kommissar	Commissioner, 2nd time
17 November 1893 to 13 August 1895		Jesko von Puttkamer, Landeshauptleute	State Captain
18 November 1895 to 18 April 1898		August Köhler, Landeshauptleute	State Captain
18 April 1898 to 20 January 1902		August Köhler, Governor	
20 January 1902 to 27 July 1905		Woldemar Horn, Governor	Acting to 1 December 1902
27 July 1905 to 7 November 1910		Julius von Zech auf Neuhofen, Governor	
7 November 1910 to 19 June 1912		Edmund Brückner, Governor	Acting to 31 March 1911
19 June 1912 to 31 August 1914		Duke Adolf Friedrich of Mecklenburg, Governor	Member of the House of Mecklenburg; later the Duke-elect of the United Baltic Duchy (5 to 28 November 1918)
August 1914		Hans Georg von Doering, acting Governor	Acting for Adolf Friedrich
(31 August 1914)	Occupation by Great Britain and France		
4 September 1916	Germany surrenders territory to occupying powers		

=== Allied occupation of German Togoland ===
Tenure	Portrait	Incumbent	Notes
26 August 1914 to 4 September 1916		Gaston Fourn, Military Administrator	Afterwards served as Commissioner of French Togoland

=== French Togoland ===
Tenure	Portrait	Incumbent	Notes
French-occupied territory
4 September 1916 to 27 April 1917		Gaston Fourn, Commissioner	Previously served as Military Administrator during Allied occupation of Togoland
27 April 1917 to 31 January 1922		Alfred Louis Woelffel, Commissioner	
30 November 1920 to 1921		Pierre Benjamin Victor Sasias, acting Commissioner	Acting for Woelffel, 1st time
26 January 1922 to 31 January 1922		Pierre Benjamin Victor Sasias, acting Commissioner	Acting for Woelffel, 2nd time
31 January 1922 to 20 July 1922		Paul Auguste François Bonnecarrère, Commissioner	
French Togoland (League of Nations mandate)
20 July 1922 to 27 December 1931		Paul Auguste François Bonnecarrère, Commissioner	Acting to 22 December 1922
27 December 1931 to 18 October 1933		Robert Paul Marie de Guise, Commissioner	
18 October 1933 to 7 May 1934		Léon Charles Adolphe Pêtre, acting Commissioner	
7 May 1934 to 1 January 1935		Maurice Léon Bourgine, Commissioner	
1 January 1935 to 25 September 1936		Léon Geismar, Commissioner	
25 September 1936 to 1 January 1941		Michel Lucien Montagné, Commissioner	
1 January 1941 to 19 November 1941		Léonce Joseph Delpech, Commissioner	Acting to 28 August 1941
19 November 1941 to 12 April 1942		Jean-François de Saint-Alary, Commissioner	
12 April 1942 to 31 August 1943		Pierre Jean André Saliceti, Commissioner	
31 August 1943 to 10 January 1944		Albert Mercadier, acting Commissioner	
10 January 1944 to 13 December 1946		Jean Noutary, Commissioner	Acting to 4 November 1944
French Togoland (United Nations trust territory)
13 December 1946 to 8 March 1948		Jean Noutary, Commissioner	
8 March 1948 to 20 September 1951		Jean Henri Arsène Cédile, Commissioner	
20 September 1951 to 25 April 1952		Yves Jean Digo, Commissioner	
25 April 1952 to 3 February 1955		Laurent Elysée Péchoux, Commissioner	
3 February 1955 to 21 September 1956		Jean Louis Philippe Bérard, Commissioner	Acting to 6 August 1955
21 September 1956 to 23 March 1957		Jean Louis Philippe Bérard, High Commissioner	
23 March 1957 to June 1957		Joseph Édouard Georges Marie Rigal, acting High Commissioner	
June 1957 to 27 April 1960		Georges Léon Spénale, High Commissioner	
27 April 1960	Independence as Togolese Republic		

For continuation after independence, see: List of presidents of Togo

=== British Togoland ===
Tenure	Portrait	Incumbent	Notes
27 December 1916 to 30 September 1920		the governors of Gold Coast	Under direct administration of Gold Coast colony
30 September 1920 to 11 October 1923		Francis Walter Fillon Jackson, Administrator	
11 October 1923 to 6 March 1957		the governors of Gold Coast	Under direct administration of Gold Coast colony
6 March 1957	Part of independent Ghana		

For continuation after independence, see: List of heads of state of Ghana

== See also ==
- President of Togo
- Prime Minister of Togo
- History of Togo
- Politics of Togo
