= Chra =

Chra may refer to:

- Battle of Chra, a battle of the First World War which took place in Togoland
- An alternative spelling of the Khra River and the village of Khra, Togoland, where the battle took place
