= Nkonya-Alavanyo conflict, Ghana =

The Nkonya -Alavanyo conflict is a conflict between the Nkonyas (ethnic guans) and the Alavanyos (ethnic Ewes) in the Volta region of Ghana. The conflict started between two individuals during Ghana's colonial days. A German surveyor, Dr Hans Grunner, drew a map of the then German Togoland in 1913 which created more problems than solve the land dispute between the Nkonyas and Alavanyos. The Alavanyos claimed that the map was drawn to favor the Nkonyas. The Alavanyos base their argument on a local border tree called Anya as the true boundary between their land and that of Nkonyas. The Nkonyas have refused to acknowledge the Anya tree as the true boundary. The land under dispute is about 6,459.82 acres and is believed to have deposits of gold, clay and bauxite. The land's soil is also rich for the growth of timber, bamboo, and very fertile for the cultivation of cocoa which makes it more valuable to the disputants.

== Contributions of colonial forces ==
Germany was mandated to give up her authority on overseas territories which included the German Togoland as specified in the Treaty of Versailles on 28 June 1919. The territory was then shared between Britain and France who became the administrative authorities in the area. Volta Region(then called British Togoland) went to Britain where both the Alavanyos and Nkonyas live and the remaining part which was then called French Togoland is now the Republic of Togo. It is believed that, the inland delimitation of the Nkonya-Alavanyo area Britain and France shared the German Togo land rather fueled the dispute that already existed. In 1940, Britain put Nkonya-Tayi (Nkonya territory) under the chief of Kpando (Alavanyo territory) which got the Nkonyas angry and they protested. They finally ended up in court after writing many letters to Britain to reconsider the matter but had no response. The court ruled based on the Grunner map which the Alavanyos already had problems with and the conflict continued to evolve and took many forms till 2016.

== Impact ==
The first attempt by the Germans to solve the land dispute when it first spark up in 1905 was to send a surveyor called Dr. Hans Grunner to draw boundaries and divide the land for the disputants. This solution failed because the Alavanyos felt the boundary did not recognize local boundaries made by Anya trees which they believe was the true boundary.

Past governments of Ghana have tried to reconcile the matter but failed. The latest strategy by the Government of Ghana is seize the disputed land and use it as a national asset which seem to have solved the problem at the moment.

A peace treaty was signed between the two parties but suffered a breach with the shooting of at Alavanyo-Agorme.
