= École normale supérieure (Atakpamé) =

Educational institution in Atakpamé, Togo

- Type: Public
- Established: 1968
- Location: Atakpamé, Togo; 7.534986°N 1.124827°E
- Website: https://ensatakpame.com/

The École normale supérieure, also known as École normale supérieure of Atakpamé or ENS, is a Togolese grande école in the city of Atakpamé. Founded in 1968, it provides education and training for teaching and research.

== History ==
The École normale supérieure was established on 4 September 1968, by decree from Gnassingbé Eyadéma. It is located in Atakpamé, the capital of the Plateaux region. The institution is organized like other ENS schools, offering education in the sciences or the humanities and social sciences, and is intended to train teachers. In the 1980s, one of the teachers, Jacob Gozo, was dismissed and then threatened with internment in a military camp by Gnassingbé Eyadéma's Minister of the Interior, Kpotivi Tévi Ojidjogbe Laclé.

At the beginning of the 21st century the institution continued to face challenges, such as difficulty in curbing violence and sexual violence in Togolese schools, despite efforts to address both issues. Initially, the institution was designed to train middle school teachers, but starting in 2010, it also began training future high school teachers.

In 2022 it implemented a series of reforms and ceased direct recruitment into the Togolese civil service, which sparked protests and criticism. In 2023, the school joined the LMD system; at that time, it had 744 students, including 232 women. The following year, it announced the establishment of another ENS in Niamtougou.

== Organization ==
=== Extracurricular activities ===
Each year a "Semaine du Normalien" (Normalien Week) is organized, featuring various activities. The school has its own football team, which competes in matches against other university institutions in the country.
