= Gold Coast Artillery Force =

Ghanaian military faction

The Gold Coast Artillery corps was formed in 1850.Their uniform was similar to that of the West India Regiments.

== History ==
The Gold Coast Artillery was formed from security units in the Gold Coast, now Ghana, in 1850. Prior to that, in 1830, the Gold Coast corps was recruited to defend the settlements of the colony. They functioned as police and consisted of small units. Gold Coast Regiment and Gold Coast Corps amalgamated in 1879 and renamed Gold Coast Constabulary, with a military role. The Gold Coast Artillery corps was disbanded in 1863 after its soldiers mutinied. Afterwards many of its members joined local forces which later became part of the Gold Coast Constabulary. In 1893-1894 they were part of the campaign against the Ashanti Kingdom.

In 1901, under the direction of the colonial forces, the Gold coast Constabulary was named Gold Coast Regiment as it was inculcated in the newly organized West African Frontier Force.

Gold Coast Regiment was the main British force that invaded the German colony of Western Togoland during the First World War. Alhaji Grunshi, Gold Coast Regiment Soldier, as part of the British soldiers, first fired bullets against the Germans during the invasion a week before the first engagement of the war in Europe.

The regiment invaded the German colony of Cameroon fighting to gain control and interject radio messages to German warships between the end of 1914 and 1915.

In 1916, Gold Coast regiment also campaigned against the Germans in East Africa. They returned to the barracks in Gold Coast in mid 1918 and did not take part in any further campaigns.

The regiment remained a part of the West Africa Frontier which was later renamed Royal West Africa Frontier Force until Gold Coast gained independence in 1957. After independence, it was renamed Ghana Army.
