= Kamina Funkstation, Togo =

Destroyed wireless station in Togo

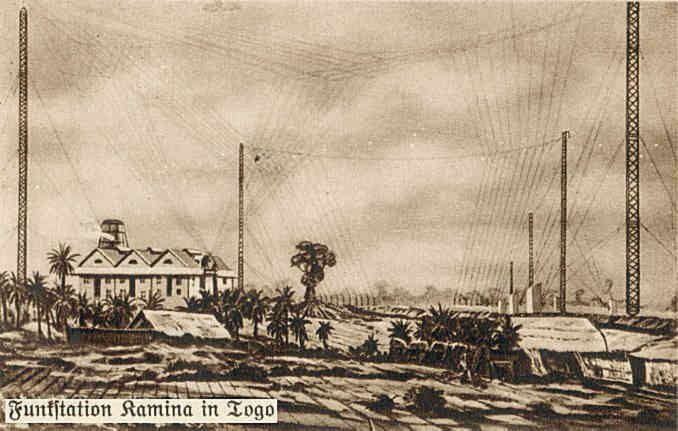
Kamina transmitter

Kamina Funkstation was a large wireless transmitter in the German colony of Togoland (now Togo) in West Africa.

== Background ==
The wireless station was built by Telefunken near the village of Kamina, in Togoland, where the nearest large settlement was Atakpamé about 5 km (3.1 mi) away. The transmitter was built on behalf of the German government, as part of a secret communications strategy as cable communications were subject to disruption at time of war. The second step was to build wireless stations with a range of at least 4,000 km (2,500 mi). The station was designed as a node and switching point for other shorter range German colonial radio stations. There were initially four coastal stations with ranges of only 1,500 km (930 mi) in German colonial Africa but the Kamina station as planned could connect with these, Germany, German East Africa (Tabora) and Windhoek, at least 3,700 km (2,300 mi) away. The decision to build a station in Togo was made in December 1910. Construction was from 1911 to 1914. By 1913 reasonably good reception from a 100 kW transmitter 5,200 km (3,200 mi) away in Germany was achieved, with full reception by April 1914. The station had its own power station for its 100 kW transmitter, with the antenna of a total length of 3,800 m (12,500 ft) strung between four 100 m (330 ft) and three 75 m (246 ft) high steel towers.

== War ==
At the outbreak of the First World War, the station repaid its construction costs several fold by promptly informing all German merchant ships in the South Atlantic and Caribbean to visit neutral ports. It also undertook military and intelligence work but the German colonial forces had no plan for its defence. Shortly after the beginning of the First World War, Togoland was invaded by British and French forces from the neighbouring colonies of Gold Coast (Ghana) to the west and French Dahomey (Benin) to the east in the Togoland campaign. The station was destroyed on night of 24/25 August 1914 by the operators to prevent it from coming under British and French control.

== See also ==
- Togoland campaign
- Kamina Barracks
