= Alhaji Grunshi =

Ghanaian soldier in the British Imperial Army

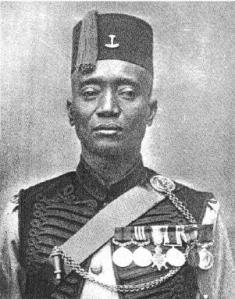
- Military career
- Allegiance: United Kingdom
- Branch: Gold Coast Regiment
- Rank: Regimental Sergeant Major
- Conflicts: First World War: East African Campaign
- Awards: Distinguished Conduct Medal; Military Medal; Mentioned in Despatches

Alhaji Grunshi, DCM, MM, serving in the Gold Coast Regiment, was the first soldier in British service to fire a shot in the First World War.

== First World War ==
At the start of the First World War, Germany's West African colony of Togoland was isolated from the rest of the German Empire. Togoland had borders with the British Gold Coast to the west, French Dahomey to the east, and French West Africa to the north. Following the declaration of war by the British Empire on 4 August 1914, the colony was completely cut off from reinforcement. With no German military presence in Togoland in 1914, the colony was defenceless other than a police force of 660 Togolese police officers serving under 10 German sergeants.

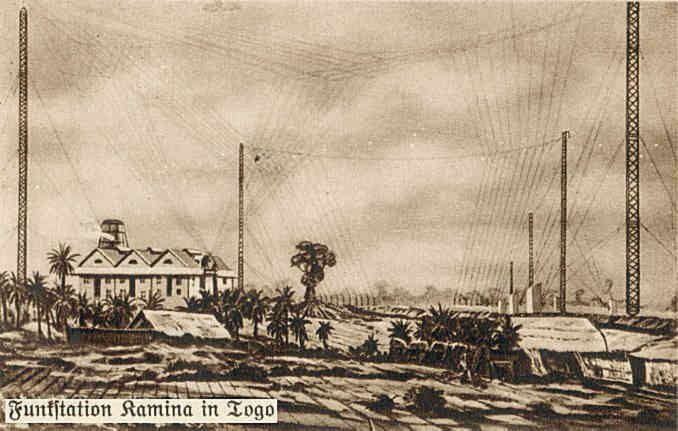
The Kamina radio transmitters prior to the outbreak of war

Although containing few resources of value to Germany, Togoland was strategically vital to the defence of Germany's overseas empire, with the powerful Kamina radio transmitters near Atakpamé the only radio link between Germany and its colonies of German Southwest Africa and German East Africa, as well as the only means of radio communication between Germany and shipping in the South Atlantic.

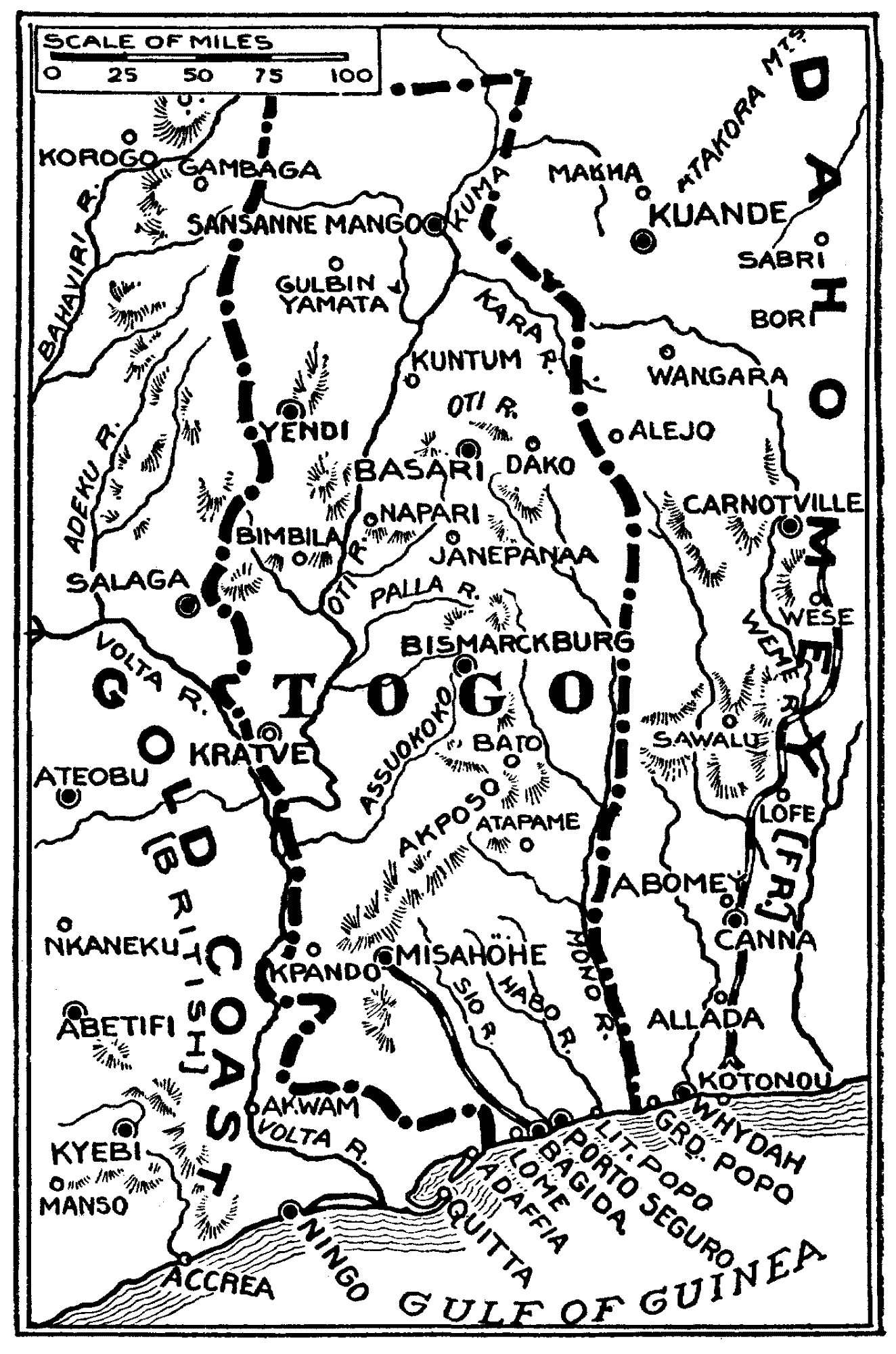
Togoland in 1914

Following the declaration of war, troops of the Gold Coast Regiment entered Togoland from the British Gold Coast and advanced on the capital, Lomé. An advance patrol of the Gold Coast Regiment encountered the German-led police force on 7 August 1914 at a factory in Notsé, near Lomé, and the police force opened fire on the patrol. Alhaji Grunshi returned fire, the first soldier in British service to fire a shot in the war. On 8 August 1914 the commander of the police, Hauptmann Pfaeler, was shot after climbing a tree to get a better view of the Gold Coast Regiment, and resistance collapsed. German technicians destroyed the Kamina transmitters on 24 August, and Togoland surrendered to the British and French on 26 August 1914.

Grunshi survived the war, having fought in three African campaigns, and as a lance corporal was mentioned in dispatches on 5 March 1918. On 13 March 1919, now a sergeant, he was awarded the Military Medal for his part in the East African Campaign.

== See also ==
- Edward Thomas fired the first British shot on the Western Front in France, 22 August 1914.
