= Wahala Cemetery =

Cemetery in Togo

Coordinates: 7.1759°N 1.1630°E

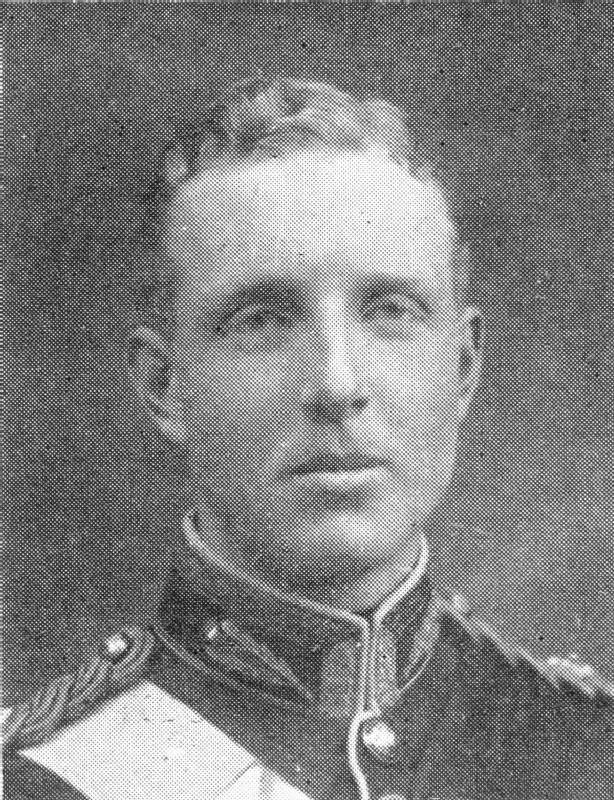
Lt Thompson was the first British officer to be killed in action during the First World War. Lt Thompson is buried at Wahala Cemetery near Atakpame

The Wahala Cemetery is a cemetery near Atakpame in Togo. The cemetery contains a single Commonwealth War Graves Commission (CWGC) gravestone, that of Lieutenant George Masterman Thompson of the 1st Battalion Royal Scots. Thompson's death in the Togoland Campaign made him the first British officer killed in the First World War. Thompson was killed on 22 August 1914 aged 24 while trying to storm the German trenches while in command of French Senegalese troops at Chra Village. He was posthumously awarded the Croix de Guerre with Palms.

A film about the cemetery, A Place Called Wahala was made in 2021, directed by Jürgen Ellinghaus. It covers the annual Armistice Day commemoration at the cemetery., , evoking Wahala's origins and past as a place of deportation and imprisonment under German colonial rule. Film webpage English version.
