= Gaston Fourn =

Governor of French Togoland (1968–1952)

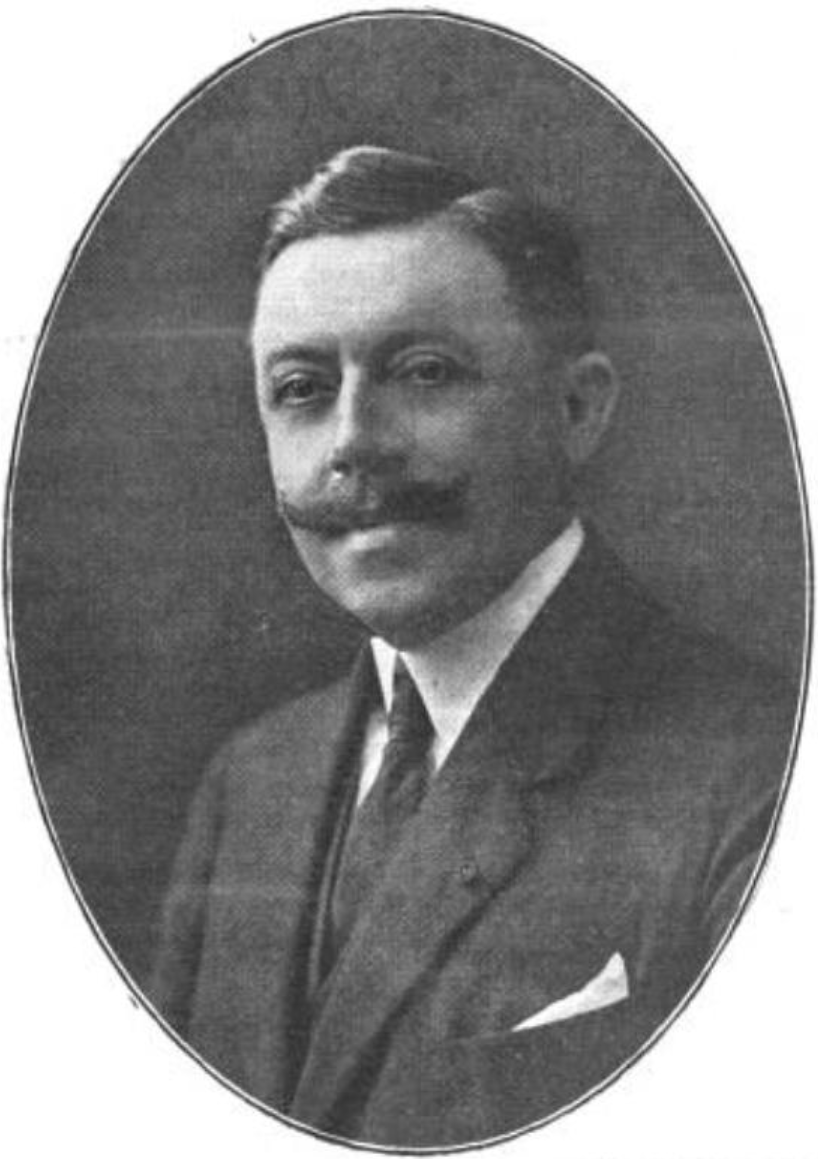
- Fourn featured in La Revue Diplomatique in 1923

Military Administrator of the Allied Occupation of Togoland
- In office August 26, 1914 – September 4, 1916
- President: Raymond Poincaré
- Preceded by: Position established
- Succeeded by: Position abolished

Commissioner of French Togoland
- In office September 4, 1916 – April 27, 1917
- President: Raymond Poincaré
- Preceded by: Position established
- Succeeded by: Alfred Louis Woelffel

Personal details
- Born: Gaston Léopold Joseph Fourn; February 24, 1868 Dellys, French Algeria
- Died: April 7, 1952 (aged 84) Boulogne-Billancourt France
- Education: École spéciale militaire de Saint-Cyr

Gaston Léopold Joseph Fourn (February 24, 1868 – April 7, 1952) was a colonel of cavalry, an explorer, geographer, and governor of French Togoland.

== Early life ==
Fourn was the son of Martin Louis Joseph Fourn, officer and recipient of the Legion of Honour, and Marie-Catherine (née Henrionnet). In 1876, he attended Caousou School, Toulouse, and graduated in 1881. From 1883 to 1889, he attended the Prytanée national militaire, and from 1890 to 1892, he was a student at the École spéciale militaire de Saint-Cyr, where he graduated second in his class.

== Military service ==
From 1892 to 1895, Fourn was a Second lieutenant of instruction at the École de cavalerie, Saumur. In 1894, he was promoted to Lieutenant in the 4th Hussar Regiment. From 1899 to 1900, he was an officer of General Belbèze, who was commander of the Meaux Cavalry Brigade. He was reassigned under control of the Minister of the Colonies, Albert Decrais, on September 29, 1901, and embarked for Dahomey on October 15.

On April 9, 1903, he was promoted to Captain in the 10th Cuirassier Regiment, and on December 21, 1907, he was appointed both Captain and Squadron Commander of the Senegalese Spahis. In 1908, he was assigned as Captain commander of the Spahis squadron in Saint-Louis and took part in the Mauritanian Campaign under the orders of General Henri Gouraud. On July 11, 1908, he was made a Knight in the Legion of Honour.

At the breakout of the First World War, he was asked to mobilize and left for France, and was assigned to the 14 Hussar Regiment as a squadron commander. In January 1916, he asked to be assigned to an infantry regiment, and was assigned to the 75th Infantry Regiment as a squadron leader and assistant to the Corps commander. He took part in the Battle of Verdun, specifically during the capture of Fort Douaumont. On March 10, he took over the acting command of his regiment as Lieutenant colonel. On March 17, while on a reconnaissance mission, he was heavily wounded by shrapnel and gave command to Major Pierlot. He was registered on the special roll of the Legion of Honour for the rank of Officer. He retired from the military in 1932 with the rank of Colonel of Cavalry.

== Exploration work ==
From 1896 to 1897, Fourn was seconded to the French army's geographical service, and in 1897, he was sent a letter of appreciation from the minister for his services. Following his 1901 placement with Decrais, he was assigned to the military mission of the Cotonou-Niamey railway commanded by Colonel Guyon. He was tasked with raising 300,000 hectares of concessions for the route of the railway on behalf of its concessionaire, Mr. Borelli. He concluded it would be impossible to lift said concessions without seriously harming the local populations. In 1905, he was a member of the mission of the routes of penetration in the AOF. From 1906 to 1907, he was posted to the geographical service of French West Africa, and was responsible for the creation the "100,000ths" map of Lower Dahomy. His work was described as of "the very first order" and is cited by the 1908 Geographical Annals. From 1909 to 1911, he continued his work with the service and was placed in charge of the delimitation of Togo and Dahomey with Captain Adolf von Seefried, as well as negotiations between the foreign affairs of Berlin and Paris. For his delimitation work, Fourn received the gold medal of the Henri Duveyrier Prize in 1911.

== Government administration ==
On July 27, 1911, he was appointed Administrator 1st class of the colonies, and was promoted to Chief Administrator, 2nd class of the Colonies on October 8, 1913. From 1912 to 1913, he continued his work as a French government commissioner for the demarcation of the borders between Togo, Dahomey, Upper Volta, and Niger. He was also appointed head of the political affairs department of Dahomey on October 7, 1912. He began to head the Civil Affairs Department of the General Government of West Africa on November 18, 1913. By governmental decree of September 4, 1916, he was appointed Commissioner of French Togoland, and was also promoted to Chief Administrator, 1st class of the Colonies.

Following the conquests of Alfred-Amédée Dodds in 1895, there was consistent tension between French governors and Dahomean subjects, who did not want to submit to colonial authorities. In 1916, revolts intensified, and on 7 April 1917, Fourn was appointed acting governor of Dahomey and on April 27, Commissioner of Togo, concurrent to revolts breaking out in Atacora and Borgou, where the Holli-Ije, Bariba, and Somba took up arms.

After a period of appeasement where Fourn attempted to strengthen authority of the local traditional chiefs, a decree of January 14, 1918 was imposed on French colonies for additional recruitment efforts. The initial quota was set for 3,500 men, but was raised by Fourn by an additional 400. Blaise Diagne visited Dahomey in June and pleaded with the local population to serve France, but the populations did not listen, fled, and rebellions against the French resumed.

In 1919, he was appointed 3rd class governor of the colonies and Lieutenant-Governor of Dahomey. Following the end of the First World War, several tirailleurs returned, changing norms in Dahomey. Demonstrations and revolts continued, especially in Porto-Novo in 1922. Newspapers denounced waste of public funds, excessive taxation, injustice of wages of natives, and racism by the colonial government. A decree on August 4, 1921 restricted freedom of press, and the Porto-Novo chapter of the League of Human Rights was dissolved.

Protests continuing in city created controversy in mainland France, and many prominent administrators attempted to discredit Fourn's policy by accusing him of laxity towards the colonial subjects and lack of firmness in administration. On August 15, 1924, he was appointed 1st class Governor of the Colonies.

Near the end of 1927, French journalist Albert Londres began a 4-month journey through French Africa, travelling from Dakar to Brazzaville. Near his time in Abomey, he met with Fourn, which he reported on in 1928, where he quoted him in Terre d'ébène. After Londres' visit, Fourn made his final political act to repatriate the body of Béhanzin, former King of Dahomey, before retiring that year in 1928 for health reasons.

== Awards and honors ==
- Knight of the Legion of Honor (1908)
- Gold Medal of the Henri Duveyrier Prize (1911)
- Officer of the Legion of Honor (1915)
- Croix de Guerre with palms (1916)
- Commander of the Legion of Honor (1926)
- Grand Officer of the Order of Glory
- Grand Cross of the Black Star of Benin
- Grand Cross of the Order of Redemption

Additionally, there is a street named after him in Cotonou.
