= Togo-Bè Kingdom =

Kingdom of Togo-Bè
- 16th century–1884
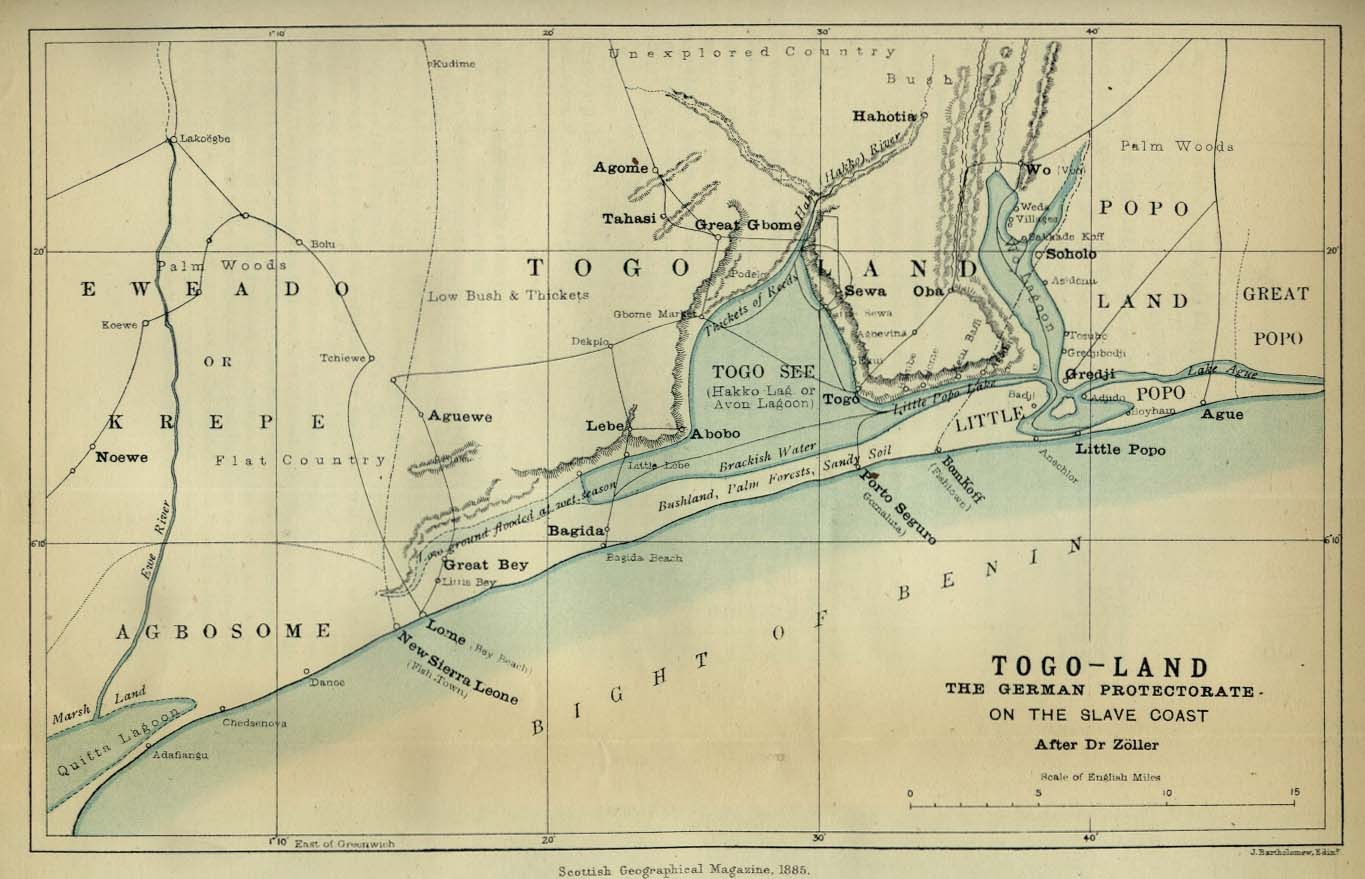
- Government: Monarchy
- History
  - Established: 16th century
  - Protectorate treaty: 1884

Area
  - Total: 600 km^{2} (230 sq mi)
- Today part of: Togo

The kingdom of Togo-Bè was a precolonial state located in the south of modern day Togo, founded by Ewe people. It was situated around Lake Togo and has possibly encompassed an area of 600 km^{2}. The date of foundation of the kingdom remains unclear and its history is widely disputed. Togo-Bè lost its independence when it became a protectorate of the German Empire on 5 July 1884. A treaty was signed by its last ruling king Mlapa III and German explorer Gustav Nachtigal. The treaty declared a German protectorate over a stretch of territory along the Slave Coast on the Bight of Benin. With the small gunboat SMS Möwe at anchor, the imperial flag was raised for the first time on the African continent. Consul Heinrich Ludwig Randad Jr., resident agent of the firm C. Goedelts at Ouidah, was appointed as the first commissioner for the territory. The most important exports were slaves, until local slavery was declared illegal and was abolished by the French in 1848, but cotton, sisal fibre, cacao beans, and different textiles were also traded. Because of the slave trade ban, its economy was ravaged and its kings lost most of their power, so it was easily colonized. Traditionally the kingdom was animist, but by 1884 had moved towards Christianity due to the influence of German missionaries, who had been operating in the region since 1847.

The area of Togo-Bè was later integrated into German Togoland (1884–1916).
