= Joël Tchédré =

Togolese filmmaker

- Born: Joël M'Maka Tchédré; Togo
- Education: Stendhal University, University of Lomé
- Occupations: Filmmaker, festival director
- Years active: 2010–present

Joël M'Maka Tchédré, is a Togolese director, producer, screenwriter. He is best known for the films such as Pacte and T’Bool. He is also an executive producer, and festival director.

== Career ==
He studied at the Stendhal University, France in Creative Documentary. After his Baccalaureate in 2006, he enrolled at the University of Lomé to do journalism. In 2014, he created the Emergence Film Festival, in Lome. Meanwhile, he became the General Delegate and later founded his production house called "Les Films du Siècle". Then he joined with Togolese national television as an intern. Meanwhile, he made the entrance test to the Superior School of Visual Arts (ESAV) of Marrakech in Morocco. After admitted to the test, he quit from that and decided to move to Institut Supérieur des Métiers de l'Audio-visuels (ISMA) in Cotonou, Benin in 2009. After winning a scholarship from the Embassy of France, he went France to do a master's degree in production of the documentary cinema of Creation in Niger.

In 2010, he made the debut short Reliquat (Le). After the success of the short, he directed two more films: Ajoda, un vieux aux bras valides and Vues d'Afrique. In 2019, he made his directorial debut in cinema with the film T’Bool, which received positive acclaim from critics. Before obtaining a master's II in Production in Grenoble, France in 2013, he made the short The films of the century. In 2014, he won the Kodio Grand Prize at the Clap'Ivoir festival in Ivory Coast for his documentary film Les nanas benz, les reines du textiles . In 2016, he made the film Pacte, which was produced without dialogue was selected at Pan-African Film and Television Festival of Ouagadougou (FESPACO) in 2017.

== Filmography ==
- 2010: Reliquat (Le) – Short film – Director
- 2011: Ajoda, un vieux aux bras valides – Short film – Director
- 2013: Vues d'Afrique – Film – Director, Producer, Executive Producer
- 2014: Nanas Benz, Les Reines du textile africain – Documentary film – Director, Executive Producer
- 2016: Pacte – Film – Director, Producer
- 2016: Lomé, La Belle – Film – Director
- 2018: Bataille intérieure – Short film – Director, Producer
- 2018: Ou…durée – Short film – Executive Producer
- 2019: T'Bool – Film – Director, Producer
