= Christelle Aquéréburu =

Togolese filmmaker

- Occupation: filmmaker

Christelle Aquéréburu is a Togolese filmmaker. She is founder-director of the film school Ecole de cinéma au Togo (ECRAN), and director of the audio-visual production company African Dreams.

== Life ==
Christelle Aquéréburu gave up work with a maritime multinational to establish ECRAN in 2009. ECRAN has taught over 100 students and produced 20 films and documentaries. The work of one ECRAN student, Essi Névamé Akpandza, was nominated in the School Films category at the 2013 FESPACO.

Aquéréburu is married with three children. Benian Melifa and Owan
