= Hans Georg von Doering =

Governor of German Togoland (1914)

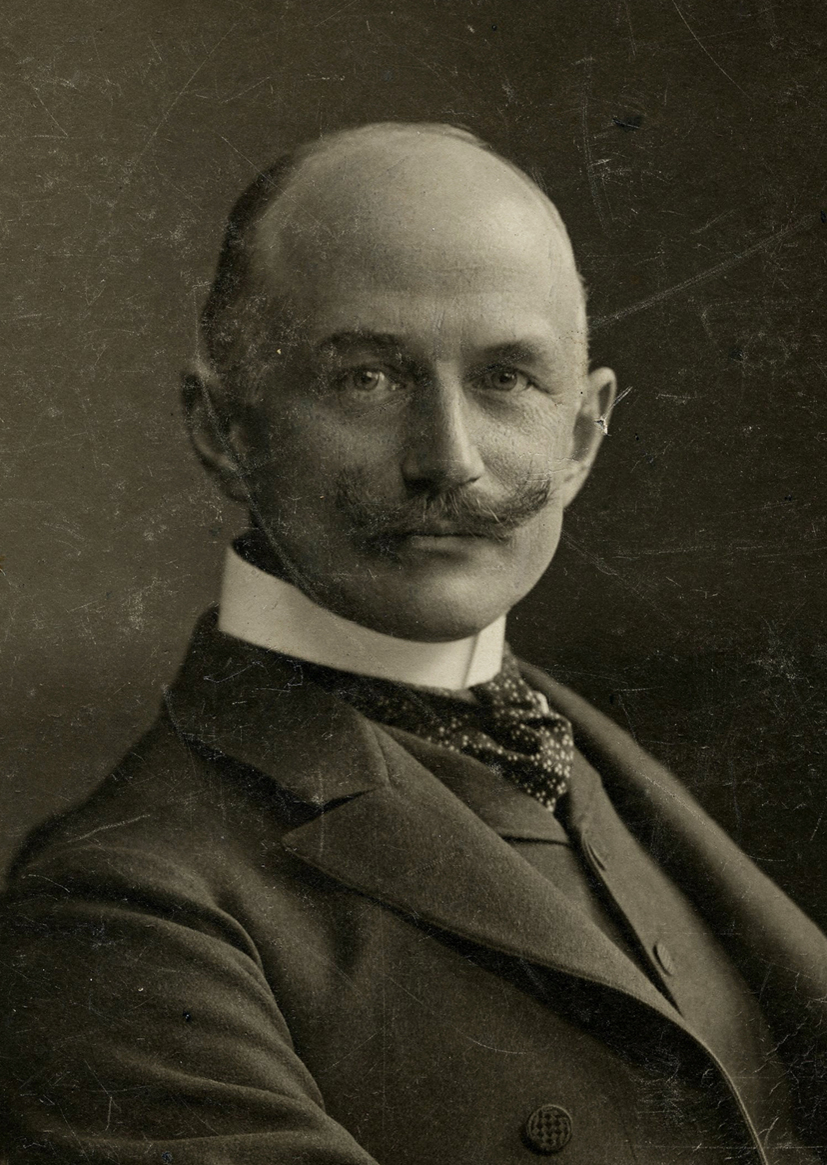

Colonial Governor of Togoland (Acting)
- In office August 1914 – August 31, 1914
- Monarch: Wilhelm II
- Prime Minister: Theobald von Bethmann Hollweg
- Preceded by: Duke Adolf Friedrich of Mecklenburg
- Succeeded by: Position abolished

Personal details
- Born: April 7, 1866 Königsberg, East Prussia, Prussia
- Died: November 19, 1921 (aged 55) Bochum, Rhine Province, Prussia, Germany
- Nickname: Dragon

Military service
- Allegiance: German Empire
- Branch: Imperial German Army; Schutztruppe
- Years of service: 1886–1911, 1914
- Rank: Major
- Battles/wars: World War I: Togoland campaign (surrendered)

Hans-Georg Wilhelm von Doering (7 April 1866 – 19 November 1921) was a German officer and the last colonial governor of German Togoland before surrendering the position during the Togoland campaign of the African theatre of World War I.

== Biography ==
Hans was born on April 7, 1866, at Königsberg as the son of Prussian Colonel Gustav Magnus Alexander von Doering (September 13, 1830 in Luxembourg, † March 19, 1896 in Oeynhausen) and his wife Hedwig, née Boie (September 25, 1832 in Danzig, † December 8 1909 in Oeynhausen) and grandson of the Lieutenant General Wilhelm von Doering (1791–1866).

After serving in the cadet corps, von Doering joined the Prussian Army in 1886 as a second lieutenant in the 98th Infantry Regiment, and was seconded to the Federal Foreign Office in 1893. He was then sent to Bismarckburg, Togo, of which he became head of the research station. From there he undertook several colonial expeditions to explore, map and develop the hinterland. Von Doering helped expand German rule over Bassari and carried out a railway exploration on the Volta River. In 1894 he established a government station in Kete Krachi. From August 1896 to December 1897 he was temporarily reassigned to Prussia; serving in the 63rd Infantry Regiment. Between 1898 and 1910 he headed the Colonial Police of Togoland and was administrator of various districts. Among other positions, he was district captain of Atakpame. In September 1900, Doering was promoted to captain and in November 1911 to major. In 1908 Doering had a daughter, Luise Doering, with a local woman in Togo. Through this daughter, Doering is great-grandfather of the Senegalese politician Sibeth Ndiaye.

In October 1911, having served in the 38th Infantry Regiment, he retired from active military service and became a councillor and government official in Togoland on November 6, 1911. Due to his quick temper, von Doering is said to have been nicknamed Dragon by his subordinates. Peter Sebald characterized Doering as one of "the most notorious colonialists in Togo".

By August 1914, when World War I broke out, he was deputy to the governor Duke Adolf Friedrich of Mecklenburg. With the latter being on leave, von Doering commanded the brief defense and subsequent handover of the colony to Anglo-French forces. His proposal to treat Togo as a neutral territory for the duration of the war was not approved. Von Doering spent three and a half years in French captivity and was then interned in Switzerland from March to November 1918.

Returning to Germany, he was married on August 19, 1919, in Berlin to Elsbeth Gertrud Bertha von dem Bussche, née Schramm (* March 24, 1882 in Bromberg; † November 11, 1936).

Von Doering died in Bochum in 1921 as a result of smoke inhalation.

=== Legacy ===
During the Nazi era, the Reich Labour Service Detachment 8/254 bore the "honorary name" Hans Georg von Doering. This emerged from a unit of the Voluntary Labor Service in Bochum, the place where Doering died.
