= Colonial Council =

Advisory board of foreign office, German empire

The Colonial Council (Kolonialrat) was an advisory body of the Government of Germany that existed from 1890 to 1907 and again from 1911 to 1913. It advised the Imperial Colonial Office, a part of the Foreign Office, on political and economic matters relevant to the German colonies in Africa and around the world. Its members were appointed by the Chancellor.
