= Atakpamé =

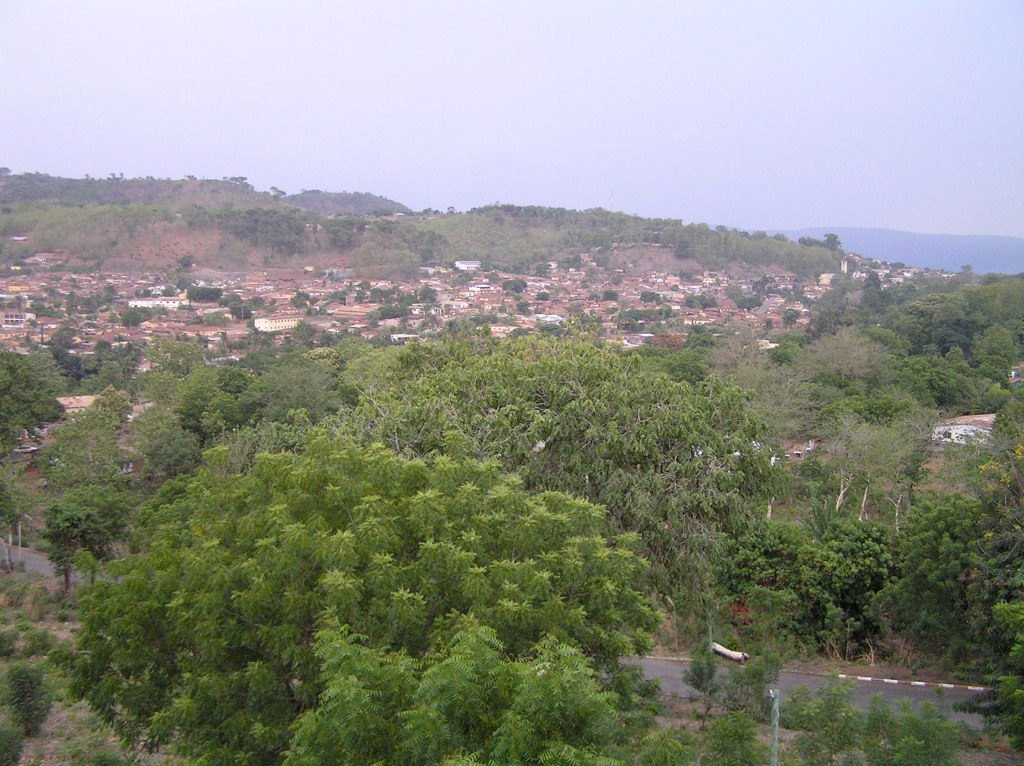
- Atakpamé in 2006

- Location in Togo
- Coordinates: 7°31′37″N 1°7′36″E
- Country: Togo
- Region: Plateaux Region
- Elevation: 400 m (1,300 ft)

Population (2006)
  - Total: 84,979
- Time zone: UTC+0 (GMT)

Atakpamé is the fifth largest city in Togo by population (84,979 inhabitants in 2006), located in the Plateaux Region of Togo. Cotton production was fostered in the area during German colonial rule.

== History ==
The Oyo Empire controlled Atakpamé in the 1700s. Dahomey attacked Atakpamé during the reign of Adandozan. Atakpame was a major source of ivory in the 1870s.

In 1898, the Atakpamé district was established in Togoland and it was the last district established under German rule. Colonial Governor Hans Georg von Doering established a district office in Atakpamé that was similar to a manor from East Prussia. The Colonial Council attempted to boost cotton production in Atakpamé in 1900. Christian missionaries were barred from going north of Atakpamé in 1913.

In the 1920s, the Atakpamé Orange Lodge was established by Anglophone merchants and Protestant teachers who moved north from Lomé and Palimé. The lodge spread the Protestant faith in the town, and educated the locals about the history of the Orange Order. It is overseen by the Grand Orange Lodge of Togo.

the Atakpamé Orange Lodge is notable among historians because its original records were kept in English, even though the town was under French rule. These records show that by the mid-1920s, the lodge was fully functional as a social and religious center for the town's people.

Agbaba, despite being in the Krachi District, was administered from Atakpamé during French rule due to the similar languages in the areas.

It was during this campaign that Alhaji Grunshi fired the first shot by anyone in British service during the war. Most native residents of the city are the Ana subgroup of the Yoruba people.

== Demographics ==
The Ewe language is spoken in Atakpamé. During German rule the area had a permanent Muslim population of 50.

== Infrastructure ==
A railway between Atakpamé and Lomé was completed in 1911. It is known as Lomé–Atakpamé railway, also known as the Hinterlandbahn (Hinterland Railway) or the Baumwoll-Bahn (Cotton Railway).

== Climate ==
Atakpamé has a tropical savanna climate (Köppen Aw) characterised by a short dry season with the northeasterly harmattan trade winds from November to February and a lengthy though not intense wet season between March and October.

Climate data for Atakpamé (1991-2020)
Month	Jan	Feb	Mar	Apr	May	Jun	Jul	Aug	Sep	Oct	Nov	Dec	Year
Record high °C (°F)	38.8 (101.8)	39.5 (103.1)	40.0 (104.0)	39.3 (102.7)	38.5 (101.3)	35.6 (96.1)	33.2 (91.8)	33.0 (91.4)	35.0 (95.0)	37.0 (98.6)	37.0 (98.6)	36.9 (98.4)	40.0 (104.0)
Mean daily maximum °C (°F)	33.4 (92.1)	34.6 (94.3)	34.5 (94.1)	33.3 (91.9)	32.1 (89.8)	30.4 (86.7)	28.8 (83.8)	28.5 (83.3)	29.5 (85.1)	31.1 (88.0)	33.0 (91.4)	32.9 (91.2)	31.8 (89.3)
Daily mean °C (°F)	27.9 (82.2)	29.1 (84.4)	28.9 (84.0)	28.0 (82.4)	27.2 (81.0)	26.0 (78.8)	25.0 (77.0)	24.7 (76.5)	25.3 (77.5)	26.3 (79.3)	27.5 (81.5)	27.7 (81.9)	27.0 (80.5)
Mean daily minimum °C (°F)	22.3 (72.1)	23.0 (73.4)	23.0 (73.4)	22.6 (72.7)	22.3 (72.1)	21.6 (70.9)	21.2 (70.2)	20.9 (69.6)	21.1 (70.0)	21.4 (70.5)	21.9 (71.4)	22.3 (72.1)	22.0 (71.5)
Record low °C (°F)	15.2 (59.4)	16.6 (61.9)	18.1 (64.6)	18.0 (64.4)	17.8 (64.0)	17.4 (63.3)	16.5 (61.7)	16.1 (61.0)	18.0 (64.4)	17.9 (64.2)	16.0 (60.8)	14.4 (57.9)	14.4 (57.9)
Average precipitation mm (inches)	6.8 (0.27)	25.2 (0.99)	65.7 (2.59)	116.7 (4.59)	161.8 (6.37)	189.8 (7.47)	231.7 (9.12)	208.8 (8.22)	204.8 (8.06)	132.5 (5.22)	13.6 (0.54)	10.1 (0.40)	1,367.5 (53.84)
Average precipitation days (≥ 1.0 mm)	0.9	2.5	7.1	9.6	12.3	14.5	17.3	18.2	16.2	11.4	1.9	0.9	112.8
Average relative humidity (%)	51	58	67	75	79	84	88	88	87	83	71	57	74
Mean monthly sunshine hours	231.6	219.6	213.2	200.9	218.4	171.1	114.1	98.8	124.3	203.4	252.8	245.4	2,293.6
Source 1: NOAA (sun 1961-1990)
Source 2: Deutscher Wetterdienst (humidity 1961-1990)

== International relations ==
=== Twin towns — Sister cities ===
Atakpamé is twinned with:

- Niort, France

== Sources ==
- Fage, J.D. and Roland Oliver (1975). The Cambridge History of Africa Volume 4 c. 1600 - c. 1790. Cambridge: Cambridge University Press. p. 811. ISBN 0-521-20981-1.

== Works cited ==
=== Books ===
- MacDougald, Duncan (1944). The Languages and Press of Africa. University of Pennsylvania Press.
- Strickrodt, Silke (2015). Afro-European Trade in the Atlantic World: The Western Slave Coast, c. 1550- c. 1885. Boydell & Brewer. ISBN 9781782044284.
- Zimmerman, Andrew (2010). Alabama in Africa: Booker T. Washington, the German Empire, and the Globalization of the New South. Princeton University Press. ISBN 9781400834976.

=== Journals ===
- Akinjogbin, I. (1966). "The Oyo Empire in the 18th Century: A Reassessment". Journal of the Historical Society of Nigeria. 3 (3). Historical Society of Nigeria: 449–460. doi:10.2307/41856706. JSTOR 41856706.
- Amenumey, D. (1969). "German Administration in Southern Togo". The Journal of African History. 10 (4). Cambridge University Press: 623–639. doi:10.2307/179902. JSTOR 179902.
- Bening, R. (1983). "The Ghana-Togo Boundary, 1914-1982". Africa Spectrum. 18 (2). Sage Publishing: 191–209. doi:10.2307/40174115. JSTOR 40174115.
- Habermas, Rebekka (2014). "Lost in Translation: Transfer and Nontransfer in the Atakpame Colonial Scandal". The Journal of Modern History. 86 (1). University of Chicago Press: 47–80. doi:10.1086/674380. JSTOR 674380.
- Kea, R. (1969). "Akwamu-Anlo Relations, c. 1750-1813". Transactions of the Historical Society of Ghana. 10. Historical Society of Ghana: 29–63. doi:10.2307/41406349. JSTOR 41406349.
- Norris, Edward (1984). "The Hausa Kola Trade Through Togo, 1899-1912: Some Quantifications". Paideuma. Frobenius Institute: 161–184. doi:10.2307/23076627. JSTOR 23076627.
