= Togoland =

German protectorate in West Africa (1884–1914); now part of Ghana and Togo

Togoland Protectorate Schutzgebiet Togo (German)
- 1884–1914
- Flag Coat of arms

- Green: Territory comprising the German colony of Togoland; Dark grey: Other German possessions Darkest grey: German Empire
- Status: Protectorate of German Empire
- Capital: Bagida (1884–87); Sebe (1887–97); Lomé (1897–1916)
- Common languages: German (official); Ewe, Kotokoli, Kabye
- Religion: Islam, Christianity, Traditional religion
- Government
- Governor
  - 1884 (first): Gustav Nachtigal
  - 1914 (last): Hans Georg von Doering
- Historical era: New Imperialism
  - Protectorate established: 5 July 1884
  - Allied occupation: 26 August 1914
  - Togoland partitioned: 27 December 1916

Area
- 1912: 87,200 km^{2} (33,700 sq mi)

Population
  - 1912: 1,000,000
- Currency: German gold mark
Preceded by	Succeeded by
Togo-Bè Kingdom	British Togoland; French Togoland
- Today part of: Ghana; Togo

Togoland, officially the Togoland Protectorate (German: Schutzgebiet Togo; French: Protectorat du Togo), was a protectorate of the German Empire in West Africa from 1884 to 1914, encompassing what is now the nation of Togo and most of what is now the Volta Region of Ghana, approximately 90,400 km^{2} (29,867 sq mi) in size. During the period known as the "Scramble for Africa", the colony was established in 1884 and was gradually extended inland.

At the outbreak of the First World War in 1914, the colony was invaded and quickly overrun by British and French forces during the Togoland campaign and placed under military rule. In 1916 the territory was divided into separate British and French administrative zones, and this was formalised in 1922 with the creation of British Togoland and French Togoland.

== History ==
The colony was established towards the end of the period of European colonisation in Africa generally known as the "Scramble for Africa". Two separate protectorates were established in 1884. In February 1884, the chiefs of the town of Aného were abducted by German soldiers and forced to sign a treaty of protection. In the Lomé region, the German explorer, medical doctor, imperial consul and commissioner for West Africa Gustav Nachtigal was the driving force toward the establishment of the West African colonies of Togoland as well as Kamerun. From his base on the Spanish island possession Fernando Po in the Bight of Biafra he traveled extensively on the mainland of Africa. On 5 July 1884 Nachtigal signed a treaty with the local chief, Mlapa III, in which he declared a German protectorate over a stretch of territory along the Slave Coast on the Bight of Benin. With the small gunboat SMS Möwe at anchor, the imperial flag was raised for the first time on the African continent. Consul Heinrich Ludwig Randad Jr., resident agent of the firm C. Goedelts at Ouidah, was appointed as the first commissioner for the territory.

In 1899, Germany and Great Britain traded territory in the Samoan Islands for the Northern Solomon Islands and control in Tonga, using the Togoland Neutral Zone (Yendi) and the Volta Triangle (the section of British Gold Coast Colony east of the Volta River) as bargaining chips.

== Economics and growth ==
Germany gradually extended its control inland. Colonial administrators and settlers brought scientific cultivation to the country's main export crops (cacao, coffee, cotton). The total number of German officials in the colony was only 12 in 1890. The colony's infrastructure was developed to one of the highest levels in Africa. Colonial officials built roads and bridges toward the interior mountain ranges and three rail lines from the capital, Lomé: along the coast to Aného in 1905, to Palime (modern Kpalimé) in 1907, and the longest line, the Lomé–Blitta railway, or Hinterlandbahn, to Atakpamé and Blitta by 1911. By 1914, over 1,000 km of roads had been constructed by the colonial office.

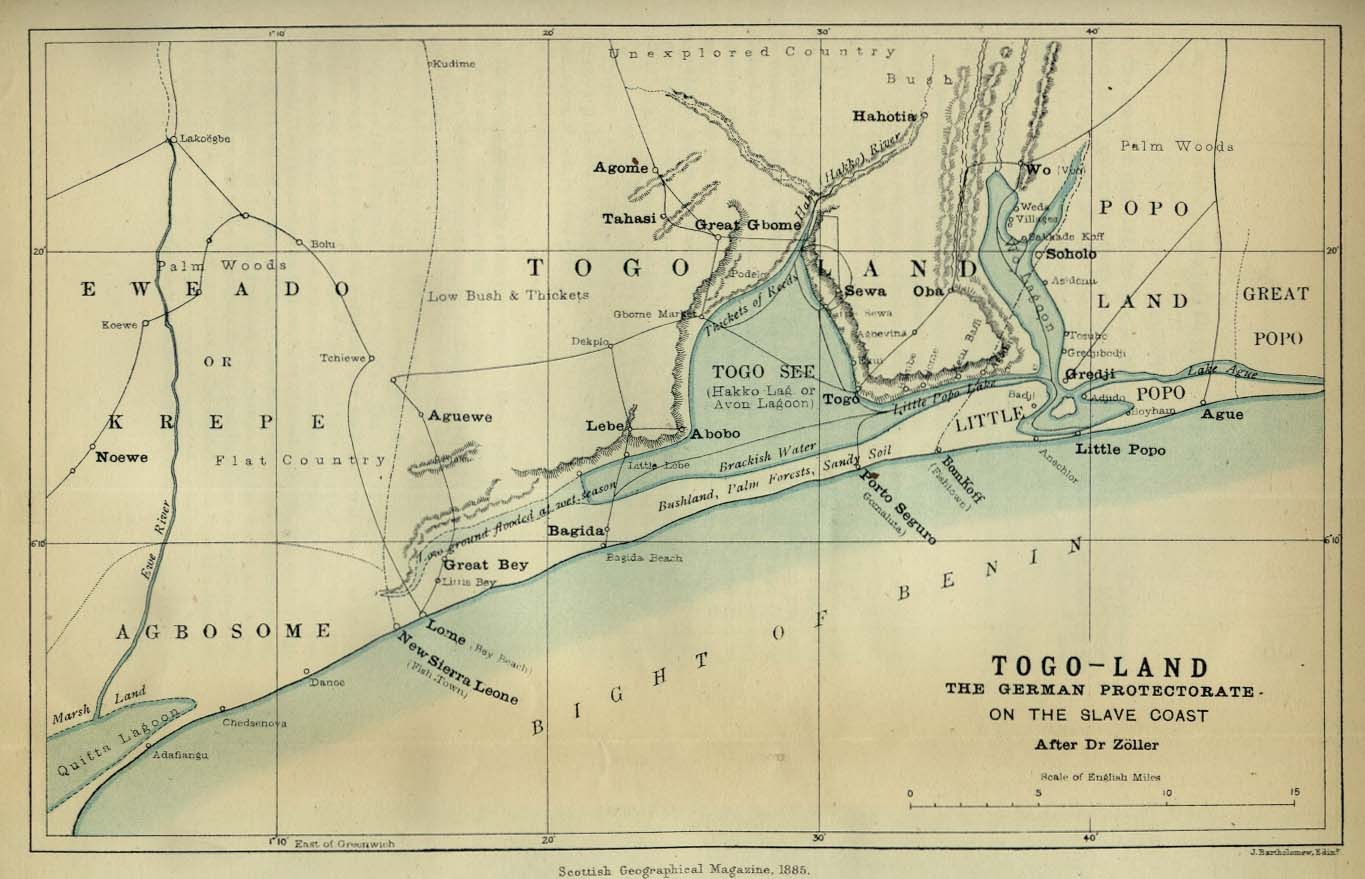
Map of Togoland in 1885

Organized in 1888 with 25 Hausa infantry, the Polizeitruppe was used to enforce colonial authority over the hinterland of Togo. Expanded to 144 members in 1894, it conducted operations against Kpandu, and "a number of towns in central Togo which had resisted the government was attacked and razed to the ground, the property of the inhabitants confiscated and the people fined sums ranging from 200 marks to 1,110 marks." Over the remainder of the decade, an additional 35 expeditions were authorized by the colonial government.

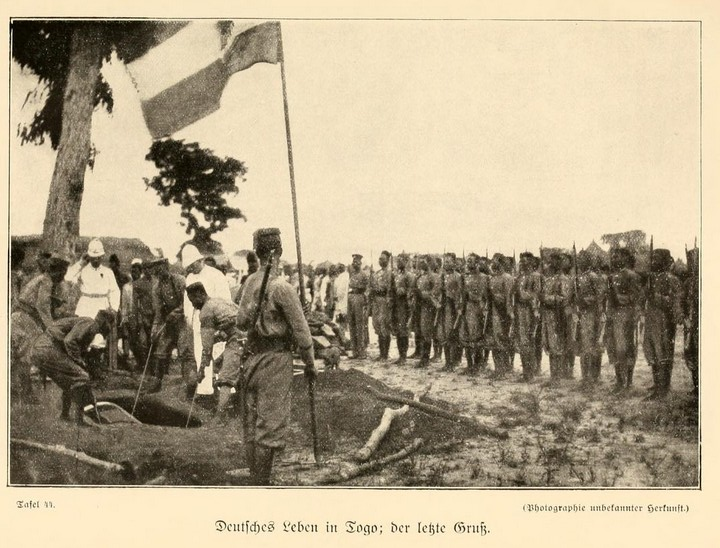
Askari troops in Togoland, c. 1911

In 1895 the capital Lomé had a population of 31 Germans and 2,084 natives. By 1913 the native population had grown to 7,042 persons together with 194 Germans, including 33 women, while the entire colony had a German population of 316, including 61 women and 14 children. In the years just before World War I, Lomé had grown into the "prettiest town in West Africa". Because it was one of Germany's two self-supporting colonies, Togoland was acknowledged as a small but treasured possession. This lasted until the outbreak of World War I.

== World War I occupation and beyond ==
After calling on the German colony to surrender on 6 August 1914, French and British troops invaded unopposed the next day. No military personnel were stationed in the protectorate. The police force consisted of a commander and deputy commander, 10 German sergeants, 1 native sergeant and 660 Togolese policemen deployed throughout the territory. The Entente forces occupied Lomé, then advanced on a powerful new radio station near Kamina, east of Atakpamé. The colony surrendered on 26 August 1914 under governor Hans Georg von Doering after the German technicians who had built the radio installation destroyed the station during the night of 24/25 August. In the weeks before the destruction, Kamerun, German Southwest Africa, German East Africa and 47 ships on the high seas were sent reports of Allied actions, as well as warnings of trouble ahead. On 27 December 1916, Togoland was separated into French and British administrative zones. After the end of World War I, members of the newly established Czechoslovakia government considered acquiring the colony as Czechoslovak Togo, but the idea never proceeded past creating a flag. Following the ratification of the Treaty of Versailles, on 20 July 1922, Togoland formally became a League of Nations Class B mandate divided into French Togoland and British Togoland, covering respectively about two-thirds and one-third of the territory.

The British area of the former German colony was integrated into Ghana in 1957 after a May 1956 plebiscite in which 58% of British-area residents voted to join Ghana upon its independence, rather than remaining under British-administered United Nations Trusteeship.

The French-ruled region became the Republic of Togo in 1960 and is now known as the Togolese Republic. In 1960, the new state invited the last German governor of Togoland, Duke Adolf Friedrich of Mecklenburg, to the country's official independence celebrations.

== Planned symbols for Togoland ==
In 1914 a series of drafts were made for proposed Coat of Arms and Flags for the German colonies. However, World War I broke out before the designs were finalized and implemented and the symbols were never actually taken into use. Following the defeat in the war, Germany lost all its colonies and the prepared coat of arms and flags were therefore never used.

Proposed flag

Proposed coat of arms

== See also ==
- German West African Company
- Gold Coast (British colony)
- History of Togo
- List of colonial heads of German Togoland
- List of former German colonies
- Slave Coast of West Africa
