= Gen-Mina people =

West African ethnic group

Gen-Mina
Guen/Guin-Mina
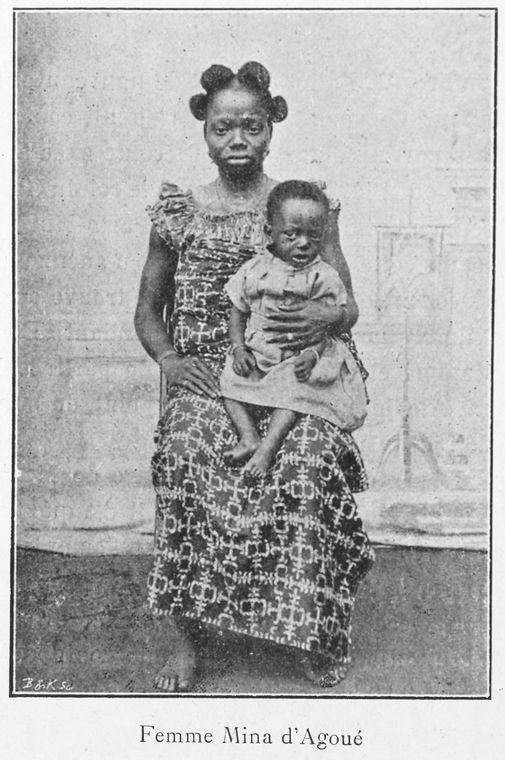
- Mina woman and child from Agoué (1900)

Total population
- Over 150,000 (1996)

Regions with significant populations
- Togo: 25,937 (2010)
- Benin: 11,686 (2013)

Languages
- Waci, Gen, French

Religion
- Christianity and traditional religions (Tchamba Vodun)

Related ethnic groups
- Ga people, Mina people (the Americas)

The Gen-Mina people (French: Guin-Mina), commonly referred to simply as Mina, are a closely linked West African ethnic group who inhabit parts of coastal Togo and Benin. Gen-Mina is a collective ethnic identity of two distinct peoples: the Gen and the Mina. The Gen-Mina primarily live in the Togolese cantons of Aného and Glidji, which they founded in the 17th century, but communities are also present in Agbodrafo and Agoué.

There is evidence that some groups of Mina in the Americas, a distinct group of enslaved Africans and their descendants in North and South America, share ancestry with the Gen-Mina.

== Ethnonyms ==
The term Gen-Mina (Note: In this article, Gen-Mina is used to refer to the Ga and Ané people as a collective, whereas Gen is used for the Ga people established at Glidji and Mina is used for the Ané people. Certain sources may expand or contract the scope of Mina.) combines the ethnonyms for both distinct people groups: the Gen and the Mina. The term Gen (French: Guin) developed from Ga. While Ga designates the Ga people from the Accra region, Gen refers to the Ga people who migrated to Glidji from there. The term Mina refers to the Ané people of Togo and Benin due to their origin in Elmina in Ghana. Aside from Mina, the Ané also go by Fanti and Adjigo.

The Gen-Mina people are referred to by many names. The Gen-Mina are sometimes called Popo. The 1960, 1970, and 2010 Togo censuses have Mina, Guen, and Anecho as synonyms for a single ethnic group, whereas Mina appears without synonyms in the 1979, 1992, 2002, and 2013 Benin censuses. (Note: These ethnonyms are in French.) A 2021 Togolese article states that some people disprove of the collective ethnonym Gen-Mina (French: Guin-Mina) and prefer Gen (French: Guin) for referring to the residents of Glidji and Aného.

=== Usage of Mina as a general ethnonym ===
Mina began as an ethnic term for the indigenous people of Elmina. As for the Gen-Mina people, Mina initially only referred to the Ané people, who migrated from Elmina, but was sometimes used for the Gen as well.

A French source from 1728 referred to residents of Little Popo, which sometimes referred to modern-day Aného and the Glidji Kingdom, as Minas (French: Minois). Starting in the 1860s, French Roman Catholic missionary Francesco Borghero and others used the term Mina to refer to the various peoples of the western Slave Coast. The French referred to the residents of Agbodrafo, Aného and Glidji, and Agoué as Mina throughout colonial rule of the region and into the modern-day. Despite the broad usage of Mina in French, it is locally understood that Mina should only be used for the residents of Aného and other nearby settlements who ultimately originated from Elmina. According to an Aného local in 2000, the term Mina is used as an ethnonym only by French-speaking scholars, while the people themselves use Gen in their own language. (Note: Neither the ethnic group nor the native language of this speaker is known.)

== History ==
There are conflicting records for the arrivals of the Ga and the Ané people in southern Togo. While some sources claim that the Ané arrived shortly after the Ga established Glidji, (Note: This claim appears in Agbanon II's 1934 Histoire de Petit-Popo et du royaume Guin and Samuel Decalo's 1976 Historical Dictionary of Togo.) contemporary European sources suggest that Aného was founded prior to Glidji. A contemporary source from the 1650s notes Aného as "a settlement of canoemen from Elmina", whereas Glidji is known to have been founded sometime between 1683 and 1687. German Orientalist Silke Strickrod and British Africanist Robin Law suggest that this discrepancy arose as a way for Glidji's rulers to legitimize their authority over the historically subordinate rulers of Aného.

=== Establishment of Aného and Glidji ===
The region containing Aného and Glidi was initially inhabited by other peoples, such as the Peda, the Hula, the Aja, and the Ouatchi.

The Ané people belong to the Adjigo clan. There are several stories for their arrival at Aného. The first record of Aného (Note: Aného means "home of the Ané" in Waci.) is as "a settlement of canoemen from Elmina" in a contemporary record from the 1650s. A contemporary European source from the 1870s tells that the Ané of the Gold Coast established Aneho, which is today a quarter within the canton of Aného, after being blown off course by a storm. Another from the 1880s states that "Anecho" was established by people from Elmina as a resting place for trade voyages between Elmina and Lagos. These sources refer to the Ané as Minas, Anés, and Fanti, and mention that the Ané settlement was established near an original Hula settlement. The 1934 History of Petit-Popo and the Guin Kingdom (Histoire de Petit-Popo et du Royaume Guin) by Agbanon II, the king of Glidji, tells that the Ané immigrated from Elmina under the leadership of Quam Desu (Note: Other sources record his name as Quam-Dessou or Kwam Dessou, with the first name being a variant of the Akan day name Kwame.) and established Aného after Glidji already existed. American historian Gwendolyn Midlo Hall links the "Mina of Little Popo" (the Ané of Aného) to a group named Mina who were displaced by Akwamu conquests in the late 1600s after first settling along the Volta river basin in the late 1500s.

According to European sources, Ga people migrated en-masse from the Accra kingdom after the 1677 Akwamu conquest and later attacks on coastal settlements between 1680 and 1681 and formed several coastal settlements to the east. They were eventually joined by Ofori, the presumed king of the displaced Accra kingdom after Okai Koi was killed, when he established Glidji in the Little Popo region sometime between 1683 and 1687. According to a local history written by Agbanon II, the Ga people migrated from the Accra kingdom under the guidance of members of the nobility including the two princes, Foli Bebe and Foli Hemadzro, after the suicide of their king Okai Koi in 1677 and the eventual Akwamu conquest of Accra. The Ga established a permanent settlement in 1680 at Glidji, which would later become the capital of the Glidji kingdom.

=== Post-settled history ===
The first detailed description of Aného and Glidji were done by John Carter, the chief factor for the Royal African Company at Ouidah, in 1687 and jointly referred to the settlements as Little Popo. Carter explicitly distinguished between the different peoples occupying either settlement and noted that Glidji was occupied by the "displaced king of Accra", whereas Aného was entirely "Mina". Until at least the 1740s, European sources referred to the Gen and Ané as Accras, reflecting the Gen's dominance over the Ané. Beginning in the 1720s, the people of Aného and Glidji began to also be referred to as Mina by the French.

In the first half of the 19th century, emigrations from Aného established Mina communities in Agbodrafo, Togo and Agoué, Benin.

== Language ==
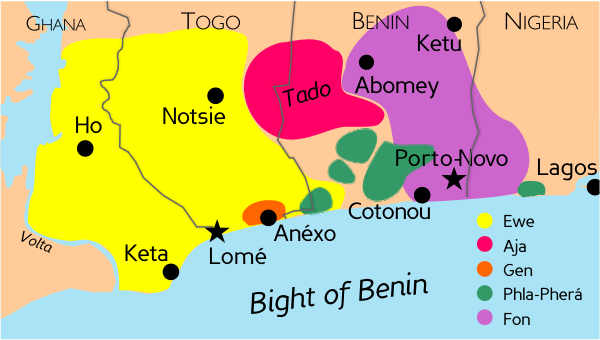
The Gen language, also known as Mina, is a Gbe language spoken around Aného.

While the Ga of Glidji initially spoke the Ga and Adangme languages, and sometimes Fante, and the Ané of Aného spoke Fante, they eventually linguistically assimilated into speaking Gbe languages due to being surrounded by its speakers. Ga was still spoken in Glidji until the late-19th century and Fante was spoken by some Anés until at least the mid-19th century. Marriages between male Ga-language-speaking settlers of Glidji and female speakers of different Gbe languages like Adja and Phla who were native to the region contributed to the development of the Gen language. The Gen language, also referred to as Ge, the Aneho dialect of Ewe, or Mina, (Note: According to a Waci linguist, the Gen language is also known as Mina and both terms are used by people interchangeably even though the former name is the correct term.) was recognized as a distinct language around the late 1800s to early 1900s.

Other sources say that the Ga and the Ané adopted the Waci language, with the Ga speaking the "Ouatchi Evegbé dialect" and adding Ga words to it and the Ané adopting the "Ouatchi" dialect. Waci forms a dialect continuum with Gen. A 1990 linguistic map of southern Togo and Benin lists Gen as spoken in Aného, Agoue, and Togoville, near Agbodrafo.

Some Gen-Mina also speak French, the official language of Togo and Benin.

== Demographics ==
As of the late 20th century, many Mina people reside in coastal Togo and Benin from Lomé to Ouidah, notably the cities of Aného, Agbodrafo, and Agoué. While as of 1996 they are primarily subsistence farmers who grow maize, millet, cassava, and plantains, they also make up an important part of the "political, commercial, and administrative elite of Togo and Benin".

=== Population ===
One source describes the Gen-Mina as a major ethnic group in Togo and Benin.

Population estimates for the Gen-Mina people vary. In 1976, the population of the Ga and the Ané, the Mina, numbered around 75,000. In 1996, the population of the Mina was over 150,000 with over 60,000 of those people being Ané. According to IPUMS-International, the 2010 Togo Census recorded 25,937 Mina, Guen, and Anecho people and the 2013 Benin Census recorded 11,686 Mina people.

== Culture ==
Epé-Ekpé, an annual festival celebrated in September, marks the lunar new year for the Mina. The four day long event has music and dance, and culminates in kpesoso, the revelation of the sacred stone. The color of the stone is said to determine the future of Glidji in the coming year.

The festival is said to have first been celebrated in the late seventeenth century.

Some Mina practice Tchamba Vodun, a variety of Vodún that emphasizes the experiences of the enslaved and slaving ancestors of those who practice it.

== Related ethnic groups ==
=== Ga people ===
The Gen people are related to the Ga people of Ghana.

=== Enslaved descendants in the Americas ===
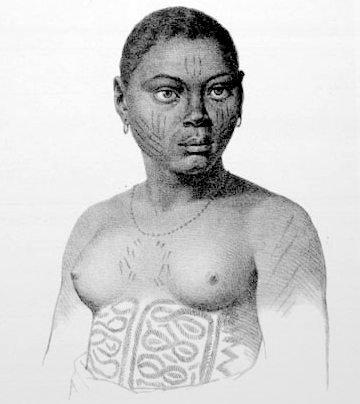
Circa-1730 portrait of an enslaved woman from Mina (Costa da Mina) in Brazil.

Mina was used as an ethonym for certain groups of enslaved Africans and their descendants in the Americas, notably in Colombia, Brazil, Louisiana in the United States, Cuba, and Haiti. Despite sharing the same name, its unclear how many Mina in the Americas were related to the modern-day Mina in Togo and Benin due to the broad usage of the term Mina. In addition to referring to the modern-day people, Mina could indicate a direct origin from Elmina, the Costa da Mina in general, or West Africa or even just the entirety of Africa as was the case in certain parts of Brazil.

There is some evidence that certain enslaved Mina in the Americas were Mina from Aného and Glidji. In Cuba, the 1909 Cabildo Minas Popó Costa de Oro and the 1794–1812 Cabildo Mina Guagui may have been populated by Gen-Mina people. Law theorized that Guagui may be a distortion of Genyi, the indigenous name for the Glidji kingdom. Antonio Cofi Mina, a leader amongst the Louisiana Mina, bore both the name Mina and Cofi. (Note: See Cuffee for other anglicized forms of the Akan name Kofi used in the Americas.) Kofi is an Akan day name which is giving to boys born on Fridays and may indicate his origin from an Akan family from the Slave Coast, a historical region which contains Aného and Glidji.
