= Mina (historical ethnic term) =

The term Mina was historically used in English, French, Portuguese, and Spanish as an ethnonym for various different African peoples and their descendants. The term originated from the Costa da Mina and was used throughout Africa and the Americas during the Atlantic slave trade. In the modern day, the term has been preserved in different contexts in certain communities in Brazil, Benin, and Togo.

== Usage in Africa ==
=== Origin of term ===
Mina first developed as an exonym for the indigenous people of Elmina, a settlement that grew around the Portuguese São Jorge da Mina castle. When used within the Gold Coast, the term referred to those specifically from Elmina whereas it could refer to anyone from the general region when used outside of the Gold Coast.

=== Different peoples historically referred to as Mina ===
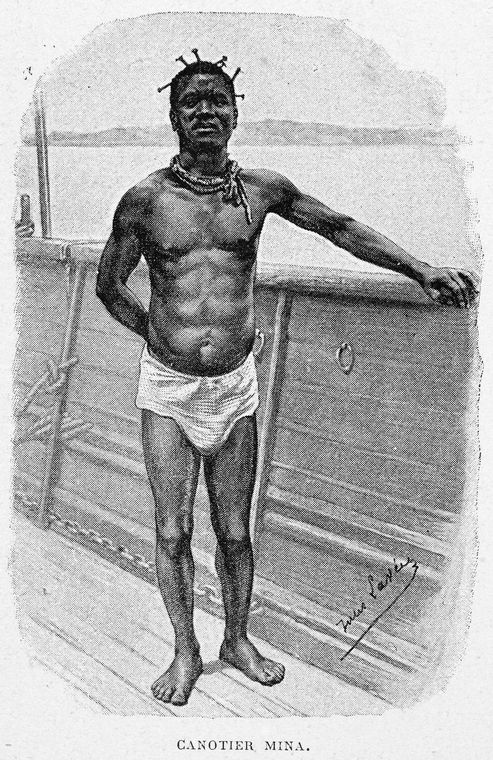
Mina canoe man (1895)

A group known as the Mina established themselves on the western bank of the headwaters of the Volta River toward the end of the 16th century. The origin of their name is uncertain, and could either refer to their place of origin near São Jorge da Mina castle or to a reputation for gold mining. These Mina were skilled warriors who adopted the usage of firearms from the Akwamu and traders of salt, fish, gold, and slaves. They were frequently employed as mercenaries across the Gold Coast and Slave Coast, forming an important element of regional armies. The Mina also participated in slave raiding on both sides of the Volta, including amongst themselves over occasional succession disputes, and many were themselves captured and sold into the Atlantic slave trade. The rise of the Akwamu empire after 1677 displaced some Mina communities eastward, leading to their resettlement in the western Slave Coast, particularly at Little Popo. During the eighteenth century, Mina settlements on both sides of the Volta came under the influence of the Akwamu Empire, before eventually being incorporated into the Asante Empire.

African canoe men and traders from the Gold Coast, sometimes referred to as Mina, were first documented working along the Slave Coast in the mid-17th century. Some canoe men arrived on the Slave Coast as crews of boats purchased by Europeans on the Gold Coast, while others came independently as traders. Some of these canoe men settled in the area and established their own communities, such as in Allada, Ouidah, and Aného. The canoe men who settled at Aného developed into their own distinct ethnic group, the modern-day Ané people of the Gen-Mina, and are still referred to as Mina.

In 1741, soldiers of the kingdom of Akyem, an Akan polity in what is now Ghana, were described as Minas.

== Usage in the Americas ==
The meaning of Mina when used in the Americas varied by time and region. There is uncertainty regarding the origin of enslaved Africans who were referred to as Mina in the Americas on whether they were Akan or Ga-Adangme speakers from the Costa da Mina and Gold Coast or Gbe-language speakers from the Slave Coast.

=== Brazil ===
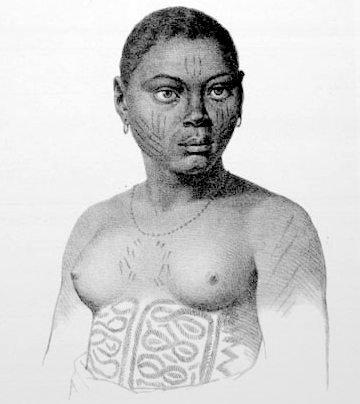
Circa-1730 portrait of an enslaved woman from Mina (Costa da Mina) in Brazil.

The term Mina was used for several distinct groups of people in Brazil. Enslaved Africans referred to as Minas were brought from gold-producing regions of Africa, such as Senegambia and the Gold Coast, to develop Brazil's gold mining industry. In the province of Maranhão, all Africans were generically referred to as Minas. In 18th-century Rio de Janeiro, enslaved Africans were grouped into one of three categories to designate their origin: Guiné, Mina, or Angola. In the province of Bahia, the Mina were split into two sub-groups due to the large West African population: the Minas-Santés (the Ashanti) and the Minas-Popos (Speakers of Akan and Ga who migrated to Little Popo). Other ethnic terms including the term Mina were also used in Brazil, such as Mina-Nago and Mina-Congo.

Enslaved Africans referred to as Mina in Brazil were sometimes said to belong to the Nação Mina (Mina nation). In this context, "nation" had a broader meaning than political entities and could denote groups of people with shared heritage, culture, or language. The Nação Mina was named after São Jorge da Mina castle.

Hall argues that Mina in Brazil, when used to refer to an origin rather than a profession, referred to Gbe and Akan language speakers who settled around the Volta River and Little Popo.

=== Colombia ===
Enslaved Africans in Colombia referred to as Minas were brought from Africa to develop Colombia's gold-mining industry in the mid-sixteenth century. The term Mina in Colombia comes from the Spanish and Portuguese word mina, which means mine as in gold mining. According to American historian Gwendolyn Midlo Hall, they were likely taken from the Bambuk or Buré goldfields in West Africa. Most runaway Africans from the 16th to the mid-18th century were listed as Mina. These runaways formed palenques which violently resisted Spanish rule; Mina-run palenques fought with firearms, committed suicide to avoid recapture, and strongly resisted conversion to Christianity.

In a 1627 publication, Jesuit missionary Alonso de Sandoval linked the Mina in Colombia to the Popos (people of Grand-Popo), Fulãos (people of Ouidah), and the Ardas/Araraes (people of Allada) with the Spanish phrase "que todo es uno" (they are all one). Modern scholars interpret this passage differently. Hall uses this passage to claim that the Mina were related to other Gbe-speakers of the Slave Coast, like the Ewe, Aja, and Fon. British Africanist Robin Law suggests that Mina could refer to Ga-Adangme-speakers of the Gold Coast and that a significant number of bilingual Mina could cause this group to be grouped with enslaved Africans from a different language group.

=== Cuba ===
Mina appears alongside many other terms for enslaved Africans from the West African coast in a 1916 inventory compiled by Cuban anthropologist Fernando Ortiz Fernández of classic African ethnicities in Cuba. While Mina was generally used to refer to anyone from the Gold coast region, more specific terms such as Arará, Dajomé, Magino, Sabalú, Cuevano, Agicon, Nezeve, and Lucumí were also used to refer to people from specific regions within coastal West Africa. The term Mina-Popo was also used in Cuba.

There were cabildos that used the term Mina, such as the 1909 Cabildo Minas Popó Costa de Oro or the 1794–1812 Cabildo Mina Guagui.

=== Hispaniola ===
==== Dominican Republic ====
In 1678, runaways slaves from French Saint-Domingue established the community of San Lorenzo de los Minas, now known as Los Minas, in Spanish Santo Domingo. The community attracted further runaways from Saint-Domingue and numbered 205 people by 1740. The residents of Los Minas were intensely resistant to christianization and endured several attempts by the Spanish to destroy their settlement. They eventually became integrated in the local community through selling cassava meal in the capital of Santo Domingo and formed communities in other locations, such as the Santa Barbara district in Santo Domingo, Villa Duarte, and potentially Mendoza in Santo Domingo Este.

==== Haiti ====
In the latter half of the eighteenth century, Mina was distinct from other terms to refer to Gbe speakers such as Arada and Rada, Adja for the Aja people, or Foeda for those from the Kingdom of Whydah. Mina coexisted with Coromanti, an English term which like Mina referred to enslaved Africans from the Gold Coast region.

=== United States ===
==== Louisiana ====
The Mina were a prominent group of enslaved Africans in the state of Louisiana. The term Mina in Louisiana is argued by American historian Gwendolyn Hall to have been used to differentiate Western Gbe speakers such as the Ewe, Ouatchi, Adja, Gen, and Hula from other groups such as the Fon.

=== Uruguay ===
Mina slaves were documented in Uruguay during the late 18th century and early 19th century. These slaves likely arrived in Uruguay after first transiting through Brazil, whether by land or through a large Brazilian slave port such as Salvador. An 1812 census documents 297 Mina slaves residing in Montevideo.

=== Venezuela ===
The 18th century Ocoyta palenque was led by the Mina Guillermo Ribas.

== Variants ==
While Mina originated as a Portuguese word, it was also used in English, French, and Spanish. Mina was sometimes adapted into these languages, such as Minemen in English, or Mine and Minois in English and French.

In Brazil and Cuba, the term Mina was sometimes part of more specific ethnic terms. Minas-Santé, Mina-Congo, and Mina-Nago were used in Brazil, whereas Mina-Popo was used in both countries.

== Legacy ==
In the present-day, Mina is used as an ethnonym for the Ané people of the Gen-Mina people. The term is also sometimes applied to the Gen people. The Gen language spoken by the Gen-Mina is sometimes known as Mina.

The term is also present in Tambor de Mina, an Afro-Brazilian religion in Northern and Northeastern Brazil, and the Casa das Minas, a temple of the aforementioned religion.

== List of Mina people ==
- Rufina, a West African woman who self-identified as Mina and was brought to Uruguay
- Teresa Mina, a West African woman who claimed belonging to the "Mina nation" and was brought to Cuba
- Antonio Cofi Mina, the leader of the Louisiana Mina leader who was exiled to Cuba due to his involvement in the 1795 Pointe Coupée Slave Conspiracy
- Emilia Soares de Patrocinio, a West African woman listed as belonging to "Mina nation" who was brought to Rio de Janeiro
- Guillermo Ribas, the leader of the Ocoyta paleneque in Venezuela
- Pedro Mina, leader of the Mina palenque in Colombia
