= Mina people (disambiguation) =

Mina people is an exonym for the Gen-Mina people of Benin and Togo.

Mina people or Mina may also refer to:

- Mina (historical ethnic term), various communities in Western Africa and the Americas
  - Mina (Louisiana)

== See also ==
- Mina (disambiguation)
