= Ga–Dangme =

Ga–Dangme may refer to:

- Ga–Dangme people, an ethnic group in Ghana and Togo
- Ga–Dangme languages, a language family spoken in Ghana and Togo

== See also ==
- Dangme language
- Ga language
