= Pointe Coupée Slave Conspiracy =

The Pointe Coupée Slave Conspiracy may refer to:

- Pointe Coupée Slave Conspiracy of 1791, an attempted slave rebellion in 1791
- Pointe Coupée Slave Conspiracy of 1795, an attempted slave rebellion in 1795
