= Ofori (king) =

King of Accra and Glidji

- Reign: 1677 – early 1690s
- Predecessor: Okai Koi

Ofori was a king of the displaced Accra kingdom and the first king of the Glidji kingdom.

== History ==
Sources regarding Ofori and his relation to the establishment of the Glidji kingdom are sparse and vary widely.

=== Modern Western sources ===
A detailed history of Ofori is recorded in a 1957 article by British Africanist Ivor Wilks that is often cited in scholarly literature but uses few contemporary sources. In this text, Ofori and his mother fled for the coast after the Akwamu attacked the Accra kingdom in 1677 by capturing and beheading Okai Koi and his eldest son and destroying the capital Great Accra. Ofori assumed leadership as the king of Accra as Okai Kai's successor, changed the capital of the kingdom to Small Accra, a Ga settlement under Fort Crèvecœur, and sought alliances with the Europeans. Many Ga towns became established around the local European forts, i.e. the Dutch Fort Crèvecœur, the Danish Fort Christiansborg, and the English Fort James, and supposedly received mainly refugees who fled the Akwamu conquest.

Sometime between 1677 and 1679, the Danes at Fort Christiansborg successfully repelled an Akwamu offensive against the nearby Ga town of Osu. Ofori was still ruling from Small Accra in 1679. French explorer Jean Barbot met Ofori at Small Accra in early 1679 and described him as a short plump man between 22 and 23.

Sometime between 1680 and 1681, the Akwamu were able to overwhelm the remaining coastal Ga settlements and incorporated their territory as a province of their empire. While Small Accra and Osu were heavily burnt, the town of Tfↄcↄ (a.k.a. Socco) under Fort James was less affected. While some of the Ga refugees fled to Tfↄcↄ, the majority resettled in other communities eastwards such as Little Popo and Ouidah. Unlike his subjects, Ofori fled to the Fetu Kingdom where its king Ahen Panyin Ashrive was a close relative. Here, Ofori received an assurance of support from Danish governor Magnus Crang; however, this promise was rescinded in 1682 after the Danes reoccupied Fort Christiansborg, which had briefly fallen under Portuguese control. Sometime afterwards, Ofori left for Little Popo.

Sometime between 1683 and 1687, Ofori established Glidji as the capital of the Glidji kingdom in the Little Popo region. Two people named Ofori are mentioned in a letter written by John Carter, the chief factor for the Royal African Company at Ouidah, on 10 May 1687. The first was called Great Ofori ("Offerry Grandy"), and the second was Little Ofori or Safori ("Soffery or Ofori Occammyes") and commonly went by Sofferry Pickaninnee (Note: See Pickaninny.). Other contemporary documents state that Safori succeeded Ofori as king sometime in the early 1690s and then died in late 1693

=== Modern Togolese source ===
In opposition to Wilks, Togolese historian Nicoué Lodjou Gayibor hypothesizes that Ofori was an Akyem merchant or war chief who led the Ga resistance against the Akwamu due to Ofori being a name of Akyem origin (Note: Foli would be the proper name in Guin, the language spoken by the Ga.). Gayibor theorizes that the Akyem may have occupied leadership positions within the Ga army on account of them being more aggressive warriors than the Ga. The Accra and Akyem kingdoms formed an alliance against the Akwamu, who sought to redirect the gold trade to their own advantage, a trade from which Accra and Akyem were heavily invested in. This theory is further supported by Ofori seeking refuge with king Ahen Panyin Ashrive who was described as a close relative and was Akan, like the Akyem. Regardless of his origins, Ofori would go on to lead the coastal Ga and Akyem to Glidji.

Gayibor theorizes that Ofori's residence given in Carter's letter is Gumkope on account of it being roughly 0.5 miles (800 m) from Attome.

Gayibor's theory of Ofori's Akyem origin is further supported by his general's name and his title: Safori, the Occamy. "Safori" or "Soffery" is an Akan title that was used by the Akyem and given to the chief general of an army. "Occamy" is a term related to the Akan word Okyeame and Ga word Otsaame that refer to a king's interpreter, spokesperson, or advisor. Carter's letter also noted that, despite being his subordinate, Safori was more respected than king Ofori due to the large army that he commanded. Gayibor writes that many of the feats attributed to Ofori may have been accomplished by Safori instead but were confused due to the similarity of their names.

Information regarding the deaths of Ofori and his general Safori are unclear and contradictory. A 1694 letter states that Ofori was killed in a battle against the Adangbe on 9 January 1694. Gayibor suggests that this may have actually been Safori. A contemporary text by Dutch merchant Willem Bosman claims that Safori was poisoned by the Ga people at the instigation of the king of Saxè sometime before May 1694. Due to confusion in sources, Gayibor places the deaths of Ofori and Safori sometime between 1690 and 1694.

=== Glidji source ===
The 1934 History of Petit-Popo and the Guin Kingdom (Histoire de Petit-Popo et du Royaume Guin) by Agbanon II, the king of Glidji, does not mention Ofori. In this text, Agbanon II states that the Glidji kingdom was established by Foli Bebe. Togolese historian Nicoué Lodjou Gayibor hypothesizes that Ofori and Foli Bebe were confused as the same person due to the many princes named Ofori, Ofori being less respected than his general Safori, or history forgetting Ofori's role in leading the Ga from the Accra kingdom to the Little Popo region.

== Notes ==
Regnal titles
Preceded by Okai Koi	King of Accra	Vacant
New title	King of Glidji	Succeeded by Foli Bebe
