= Mpur language (Ghana) =

Language of Ghana

Mpur
- Native to: Ghana
- Region: Tuluwe
- Extinct: by 1963
- Language family: unclassified

Language codes
- ISO 639-3: None (mis)
- Glottolog: None

Mpur is an unclassified language once spoken in the village of Tuluwe at the confluence of the Black and White Voltas, and in Kusawgu Division. It is near the poorly attested language Mpra spoken in the nearby village of Butie, which may turn out to be a language isolate, though the Mpra people come from further west.
