= Agbodrafo =

Town in Togo

Agbodrafo Safe Harbor, Porto Seguro
- Location in Togo
- Coordinates: 6°12′05″N 01°28′44″E
- Country: Togo
- Admin. division: Maritime Region

Agbodrafo, or Safe Harbor (from Portuguese Porto Seguro), is a town in southern Togo in the Maritime Region, lying between the Atlantic Ocean and Lake Togo. It grew around a Portuguese fort and was known to Europeans as Porto Seguro. It is now a popular seaside resort.

The city of Agbodrafo has been recognised as part of the "Slave coast". There are some vestiges of the past, such as the "house of slaves" (Woold Homé) or the well of chained ones.
