= Ari language =

Ari may refer to:

- Ari language (New Guinea), a Papuan language of the Trans–New Guinea family
- Aari language, an Omotic language of Ethiopia
- Ari language (Ivory Coast), a Kwa language of Ivory Coast
