= Costa da Mina =

Historical region in coastal West Africa

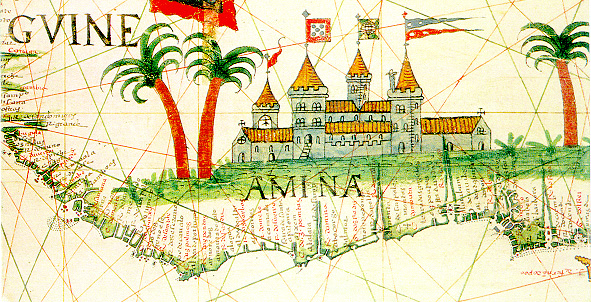
Circa-1570 Portuguese map of the Costa da Mina labeled as Amina with the São Jorge da Mina prominently displayed.

The Costa da Mina (lit. 'Coast of the Mine'), sometimes shortened to Mina, is a Portuguese term for the loosely defined coastal region in Western Africa that sometimes overlapped with parts of the Gold Coast and the Slave Coast. The region was initially settled by the Portuguese due to its gold mines, but came to be an important site during the Atlantic Slave Trade after the establishment of the Portuguese Gold Coast colony. The name of the region is preserved in place names, languages, and communities in Western Africa and Brazil.

== Etymology ==
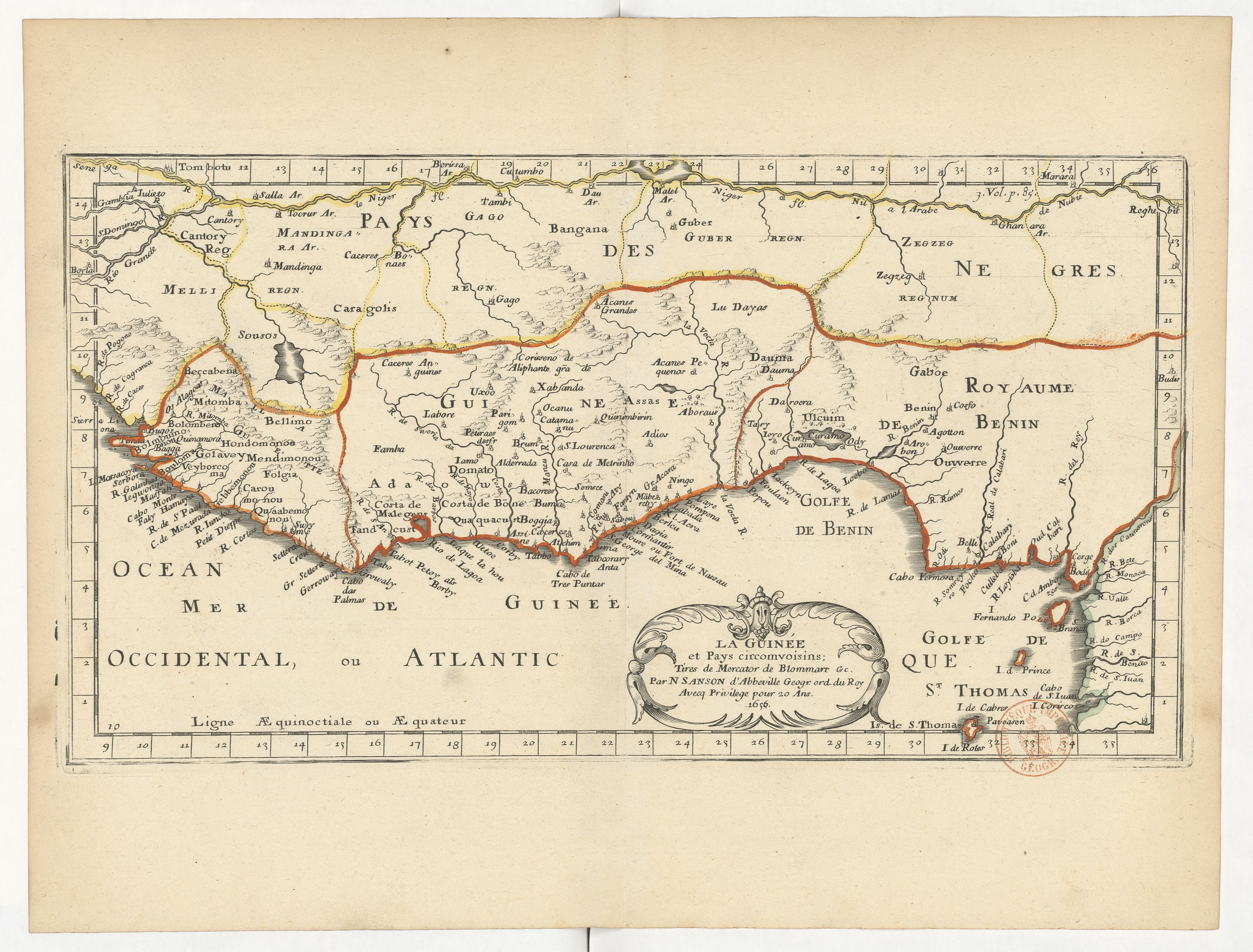
A 1706 map of coastal West Africa with São Jorge da Mina shown as "S. George del Mina"

Mina (Portuguese: mine) in Costa da Mina refers to gold mining, and was used in the term A Mina (Portuguese: the mine) around 1471 to denote the coastal Ghanaian town of Shama and the surrounding area where the Portuguese first purchased gold in the region. Some time shortly after the Portuguese erected the São Jorge da Mina castle 30 kilometres (19 miles) away in the Ghanaian village of Edina in 1482, the term Mina came to refer primarily to the village. The village is now known as Elmina.

=== Legacy ===
The term Mina is presently preserved in West Africa in the name of the Ghanaian town of Elmina and the Gen language, a language spoken in coastal Togo that is also known as Mina. The term is also present in Tambor de Mina, an Afro-Brazilian religion in Northern and Northeastern Brazil, and the Casa das Minas, a temple of the aforementioned religion.

The term Mina was sometimes used during the Atlantic slave trade as an ethnicity to refer to enslaved people who were either descendants of those sent from the Costa da Mina or were themselves transported from there. These enslaved Africans and their descendants in countries like Brazil, Cuba, and the United States would also be known as the Mina or were said to belong to the Mina people.

== Location ==
Initially, the Costa da Mina broadly referred to the region surrounding the São Jorge da Mina castle. After the Dutch victory in the 1637 Battle of Elmina limited the Portuguese to only buying enslaved Africans in Grande Popô (Grand-Popo), Ajudá, Janquim (Godomey), and Apá (Badagry), the term Costa da Mina also began to refer to the Slave Coast in addition to its prior definition.

=== Different definitions of its borders ===
The exact boundaries of the region varied in size and location depending on the time or source.

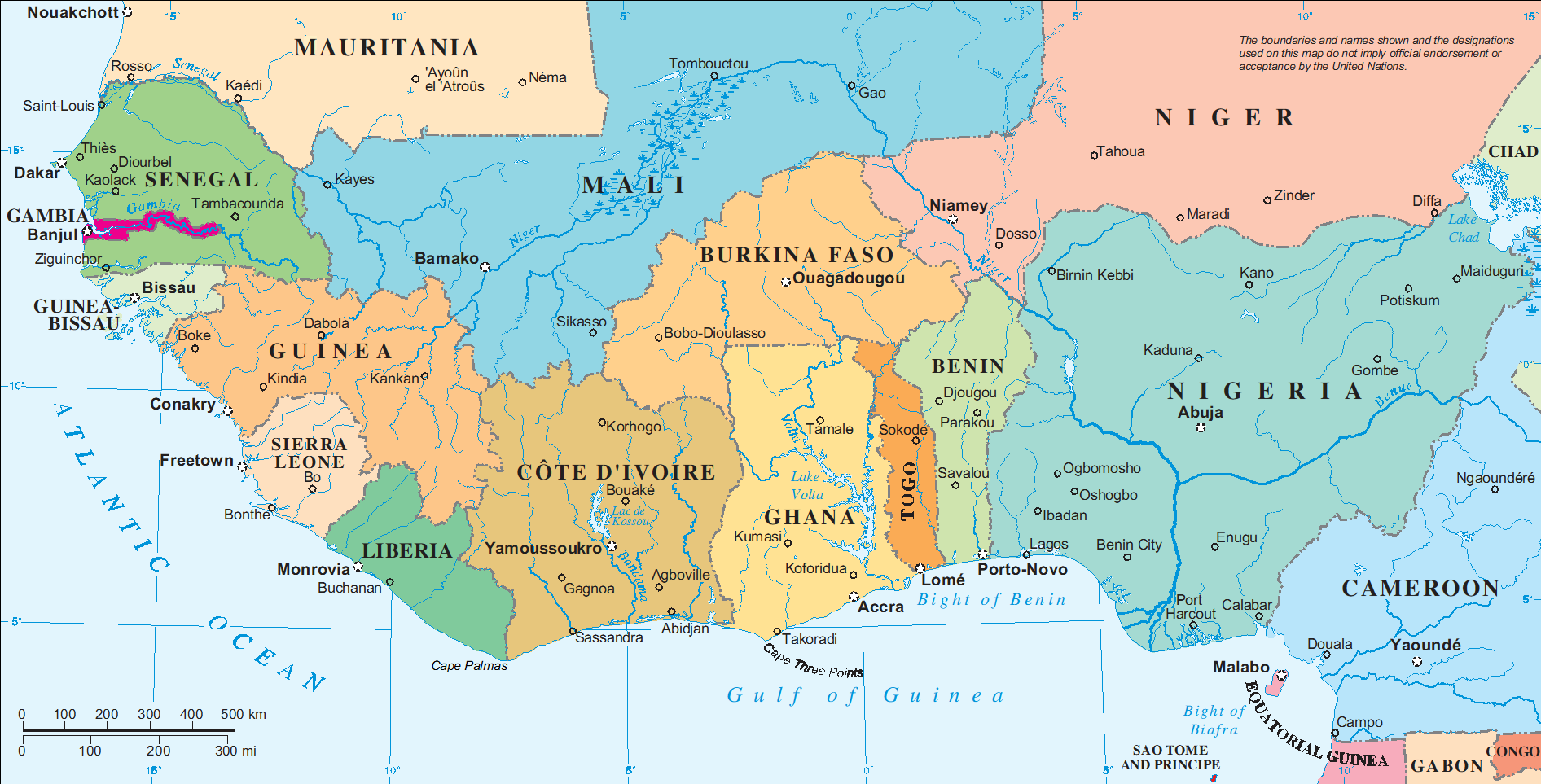
Modern day map of countries in West Africa

==== Scholars and organizations ====
The National Archives of Brazil defines the Costa da Mina as corresponding to modern-day Benin, Togo, and part of Ghana.

Adjunct Professor Juliana Barreto Farias at Bahia State University and Professor Mariza Carvalho Soares at the Fluminense Federal University refer to the Costa da Mina as corresponding to a region contained within the coastline of modern-day Ghana, Togo, Benin, and Nigeria, which sometimes extends to the limits of the Sahel

Anthropologist Pierre Verger considered the Costa da Mina to be the region of Guinea between the Volta river and Cotonou.

Anthropology Professor at the Federal University of Bahia Luis Nicolau Parés wrote that the Costa da Mina encompassed all of the Gold Coast and the Slave Coast, being the entire coastline between Cape Three Points and the Rio Lagos (Lagos river). A 1485 map made by Portuguese explorer Ruy de Sequeira labeled the channel connecting the Lagos Lagoon in the modern day city of Lagos, Nigeria to the Atlantic Ocean as the Rio do Lago.

Assistant Professor at the State University of Feira de Santana Carlos Francisco da Silva Junior wrote that the Costa da Mina encompassed the Ivory Coast, the Gold Coast, and the Slave Coast.

==== Historical documents ====
A 1471 Portuguese map demarcated the Costa da Mina as extending from Cabo das Tres Pontas (Cape Three Points) to the Rio da Volta (Volta River).

A 1607 Portuguese document describing trade along the West African coast describes the Costa da Mina as the entire coast between Cape Palmas and the Volta river.

== History ==
Agrarian settlements that worked iron and gold began to settle the region that came to be known as the Costa da Mina by 1000. Between 1125 and 1250, West African gold became highly sought after in Europe due to its purity and availability as well as no alternative gold mines existing in Europe at the time. West African gold would be traded to Morocco, Tunisia, and Egypt were they would be minted into coins and then traded throughout Europe through the Iberian Peninsula and Italian Peninsula. Portuguese interests in controlling the gold trade led to partnerships between the Portuguese crown and Italian merchants to finance several Portuguese trade expeditions to coastal West Africa. One such expedition led by Fernão Gomes first discovered gold being traded in the region in January 1471 in a village named Shama. This discovery was considered by then Portuguese scholars and historians as the "most significant ‘discovery’ in the oceanic exploration of the West African coast". The presence of gold in the region was so significant that the region was named after it.

Disputes between the Portuguese and the Spanish over ownership of this newfound region led to the signing of the Treaty of Alcáçovas in 1479, which granted Portugal exclusive rights over coastal West Africa. Around 1482 to 1483, the Portuguese erected the São Jorge da Mina, a fortified base which was the first permanent European settlement in West Africa, to store their goods and secure their trade monopoly over their European competitors in the region. The fortress enabled the Portuguese to establish the Portuguese Gold Coast colony and served as the center of the gold trade, slave trade, commerce, and missionary work in the region. The second-highest number of enslaved Africans sent to Brazil after Portuguese Angola in central Africa were sent from the Costa da Mina through the São Jorge da Mina. In the 1570s, some Portuguese in São Jorge da Mina and many members of the Council of State in Lisbon vouched for the region to be colonized. Between 1580 and 1640, Portuguese supremacy over the region would slowly diminish due to shifting priorities under the reign of Sebastião, competition from pirates, and direct conflict with the Dutch would lead to the Portuguese conceding their claims to the region.

== See also ==
- Gold Coast, the same region as known by other colonizers
- Portuguese Gold Coast, colony established by the Portuguese in the Costa da Mina
