= Prayer kettle =

350-year-old cast-iron vessel

The Ford family prayer kettle is a large cast-iron vessel owned by Reverend Will Ford III, a preacher from Dallas, Texas. As of 2017, the prayer kettle was over 350 years old. The kettle was used by his enslaved African American ancestors in Louisiana, who whispered Christian prayers for freedom into the kettle, so that their enslavers would not be able to hear them. Also used for cooking and laundry, the kettle was turned upside down and raised off the dirt floor with rocks, creating a narrow opening into which the family could say their prayers. Knowing that the abolition of slavery was unlikely in their lifetimes, Ford's ancestors also prayed for freedom for their descendants.

The kettle was passed down from Harriet Locket to Nora Locket, and then to Ford's grandfather, William Ford, Sr. Hill, the founder of Hilkiah Ministries, has toured the United States with his prayer kettle to spread his message of hope and racial reconciliation. The story of the kettle is told in The Dream King, a book co-authored by Ford and Matt Lockett.
