= Abidji language =

Kwa language spoken in Ivory Coast

Abidji
- Abiji
- Native to: Ivory Coast
- Region: Lagunes District
- Ethnicity: Abidji
- Native speakers: 85,000 (2017)
- Language family: Niger–Congo?: Atlantic–Congo; Kwa; Abidji
- Dialects: Enyembe; Ogbru
- Writing system: Latin

Language codes
- ISO 639-3: abi
- Glottolog: abid1235

Abidji (also known as Abiji and Ambidji) is a language of uncertain classification within the Kwa branch of the Niger–Congo family. It is spoken in Ivory Coast.

It has two dialects: "enyembe" and "ogbru". These dialects' names are used by the members of these Abidji-speaking ethnic groups to refer to themselves. The name Ambidji was given to the language by these groups' neighbors.

== Villages ==
Abidji is spoken in these villages:

Village Name	Native name (IPA)
Soukoukro	sukwebi
Badasso	gbadatɛ
Elibou	elibu
Sahuyé	sayjɛ
gomon	goma
Yaobou	jawebi; joabu; djabõ; nadja côtôcô; Amougbroussandou
Sikensi	sikãsi
Bécédi	besedi
Brafoueby	brafwebi
Bakanou A, B	gbakamɔ̃
Katadji	kalaɟi
Abiéhou	abjeu
Akakro	akabi
Ahimangbo	emãgbo
Akoungou	akpũmbu

== Writing system ==
Abidji is written with a Latin alphabet, using the graphemes of the practical writing for the languages of the Ivory Coast. The letter upsilon ⟨Ʊ, ʊ⟩ is often replaced with the V with hook ⟨Ʋ, ʋ⟩.

Abidji alphabet
Capital letters
A	B	C	D	E	Ɛ	F	G	Gb	J	I	Ɩ	K	Kp	L	M	N	Ny	O	Ɔ	P	R	S	T	U	Ʊ / Ʋ	W	Y	ʔ
Lowercase letters
a	b	c	d	e	ɛ	f	g	gb	j	i	ɩ	k	kp	l	m	n	ny	o	ɔ	p	r	s	t	u	ʊ / ʋ	w	y	ʔ
Phonetics
/a/	/b/	/c͡ç/	/d/	/e/	/ɛ/	/f/	/ɡ/	/ɡ͡b/	/ɟ͡ʝ/	/i/	/ɪ/	/k/	/k͡p/	/l/	/m/	/n/	/ɲ/	/o/	/ɔ/	/p/	/r/	/s/	/t/	/u/	/ʊ/	/w/	/j/	/ʔ/

The nasal vowels are written with ⟨n⟩ (⟨m⟩ before ⟨p⟩ and ⟨b⟩): ⟨an, en, ɛn, in, on, ɔn, un, ʊn ou ʋn, ɩn⟩.

== Phonology ==
=== Consonants ===
Abidji consonants
		Labial	Alveolar	Palatal	Velar	Labial– velar	Glottal
Plosive	voiceless	p	t	c͡ç	k	k͡p	ʔ
Plosive	voiced	b	d	ɟ͡ʝ	g	ɡ͡b	
Nasal		m	n	ɲ			
Fricative		f	s				h
Approximant			l	j		w	
Trill			r				

=== Vowels ===
All vowels except /e/ have contrastive nasal forms.

Abidji vowels
	Front	Central	Back
Close	i		u
Near-close	ɪ		ʊ
Mid	e		o
Near-open			ɔ
Open		a	

Abidji's phonology is characterized by vocal harmony: its 9 vowels are divided into two sets, based on the position of the root of the tongue at the time of articulation.

- The vowels /i, e, u, o/ are fronted because they are articulated with the root of the tongue at the front of the mouth.
- The vowels /ɩ, ɛ, ʋ, ɔ/ are retracted because they are articulated with the root at the back.
- The vowel /a/ behaves like a retracted vowel in verbal forms, but in nominal forms, it can appear with both fronted and retracted vowels (ex: atingbre: "trail"; abrɛbɛ: "pineapple")
- All the vowels included in a single word belong to one of these two sets: yɔfʋ: love; kikeu: "shake".

All of these 9 vowels can be nasalized. Beyond that, Abidji only contains open syllables, with the sole exception being the first syllable of the word darsɛ: "metal pot", likely a loanword.

=== Tones ===
Abidji is a tonal language. Therefore the pitch of each syllable plays a role in the meaning of words or conjugated form of a verb. Abidji has two phonemic tones, described as high /˦/ and low /˨/. These can be attached to one or two vowels (e.g. kpan (H): "all"; kpan (HL): "human being").

== Grammar ==
The language's most distinct grammatical aspect is its verbal system, which is highly structured. Abidji contains 4 verb groups which are distinguished by their combination of tonal and syllabic arrangements.

The first group contains verbs with a monosyllabic root which cannot accommodate modulated tones (e.g. mɩkan: "I say" (L - H))

The second group contains verbs with a monosyllabic root which can carry a modulated tone (e.g. mɩkan: "I have" (L - HL))

The third group contains verbs with a polysyllabic root in which each syllable can only carry a singular tone (e.g. mubutu: "I ask" (L - H - L))

The fourth group only contains 5 exceptionally common verbs ("to go"; "to come"; "to eat"; "to die"; and "to fight") for which the verbal root alternates between a sequence of h followed by a vowel ('hi'), a sequence of two vowels ('ie'), and a sequence of ʔ followed by three vowels, based upon the conjugation of the verb in a given aspect/tense (e.g. mehi: "I come"; mie: "I came"; ʔieu: "to come" (infinitive))

== Dialectic differences ==
Lexical differences between the enyembe et ogbru dialects:

english	français	abidji (enyembe)	adidji (ogbru)
Bee	abeille	alãnɟa	ɔlɔ̃nɟa
Bark (v.)	aboyer	lubu	nɛgbɛ
Needle (n.)	aiguille	ãfjɔr	afofjɔru
Drying area	aire de séchage	beta	gbeta
Match (n.)	allumette	kpasẽ	tɛpe
Friend	ami	amwã	ɔmɔ̃
Pineapple	ananas	abɛbrɛ	abrobɛ
Animal	animal	onjɛ	n̥njɛ
Wait (v.)	attendre	kpɔ	kpɔ̃
Today	aujourd'hui	amnɔ̃	amrɛ̃
Brawl (n.)	bagarre	m̥be	m̥me
Broom (outdoor)	balai (cour)	tẽfɔ	tɔ̃fɔ̃
Broom (indoor)	balai (chambre)	kparuwe	ɓawre
Build	bâtir	rɔ	lɛ
Gravel	boue	kɔdɔgɔ	kɔdɔgɔ̃
Corpse	cadavre	gwɛ̃tɛ	ãẽte
Underwear	caleçon	jɔmkoto	jamkoto
Cane (n.)	canne	kpama	kpamã
Cowrie	cauri	n̥srowa	n̥zrowa
Singing	chant	eɟi	edʒi
Hat	chapeau	kile	kre
Fly-swatter	chasse-mouche	sajɛ	sãẽ
Cat	chat	ɟiɟra	ɟiɟraɔ̃; afana
Warm	chaud	ɛt'e	ɛtsẽ
Goat	chèvre	ŋ̥hi-ji	ŋhɛ̃
Lemon	citron	lɛkpɛ̃	ɓɛnɛ̃
Heart	cœur	lubolɔwɛ	lubwolɛ
Concession (land grant)	concession	lukpomõ	lukpohũ
Crow	corbeau	jebrekpɔ̃ɔ̃	jeblekpɔmɛ̃
Run (v.)	courir	jene	dwe / due
Knife	couteau	bajiremi	bajirumi; akrabo
Toad	crapaud	dɔntrɔ	trɔntrɔ
Dance (v.)	danser	bu	bu-sɟi
Tooth	dent	ɛɲi	eɲẽ
Give	donner	to	tɔ
Back	dos	ge	gẽ
Right (dir.)	droite	kpese-bɔ	kpɛsɛ-bɔ
Enter	entrer	hɔ	wɔ
Sponge	éponge	bela	bla
Spouse (fem.)	épouse	ji	ju
Marry	épouser	hɔ̃	wã
Spouse (m.)	époux	hɛ	he
Stretch	étendre		pɛ (têŋge = Drag)
To smoke	fumer	bɛ ... je	bɔ ... je
Ant	fourmi		mĩndere
Smoke	fumée	minegbe	mregbe
Son-in-law	gendre	misja	mesja
Okra	gombo	aɟowɛ	adʒwɛ
Guava	goyave		gbjãsɔ
Frog	grenouille	abjam(ɔ̃)	abajamɔ
Big	gros		lɔkpɔ
Humid	humide	plɔ	pɔtɔ
Intestines	intestins	rɔwɔwɛ	rɔrɔcɛ
Play (v.con.)	joue	rɛkpɛ	sɛkpɛ
Heavy	lourd	li	lɛhẽ
Moon	lune	ŋwɔ̃	hwɔ̃
Chew	mâcher	tɔ	ta
Machete	machette	akrabɔ	bese
But	mais	dodo	ɔkɔ̃mɔ̃nɔ̃
House	maison	kã	kõ
Eat	manger	he	ɛ/e
Medicine	médicament	rɛkpa	lɔkpa
Chin	menton	hõhɔ	hõhɔ̃
Watch (v.con.)	montre	nɔ̃	nɛ̃
Mortar	mortier	lufũ	lufu
Knot (n.)	nœud	sãŋgɔtɔ	sãŋgoto; logbo
Eye (n.)	œil	nɔ̃nɔ̃wɛ	nɛ-sɛ̃
Bird	oiseau	rɔwarɔ	lowarɛ
Raffia palm	palmier raphia	ŋ̥ko-t'i	ŋkwe-t'i
Lost	perdu	la ... kpɛ	nepu
Small (adj.)	petit	tekre	tekrae
Trail (n.)	piste	atẽŋgbre	atĩŋgbre
Cry (v.)	pleurer	to-moto	to-mite
Fish (n.)	poisson	sĩje	sije
Take (v.)	prendre	co	tʃo
Price	prix	ɛno	ɛnnɛ
Tail	queue	nihyĩ	lĩ
Look at	regarder	deke	leke
Region	région	mãje	mãɛ̃ (earth)
Meal	repas	m̥bɔ	m̥bwɔ
Scorpion	scorpion	sãŋgrãji	kãŋgabedi
Salt	sel	muhu	muwu
Catfish	silure	ɟemne	ɟemre
Mouse	souris	lɔkp	lɔkpõ
Taro root	taro	aɟipu	abjake
Termite	termite	n̥ce (termite mound)	m̥fɔ
Ground	terre	wɔtɔ	wete
Fall (v.)	tomber	pe	pɔ
Turtle/tortoise	tortue	ɛdeke	lu-kpokpo (Sudden-death?)
Cow	vache	dẽ	gũ
Wind	vent	lɛfã	lɔfã
Village	village	ebi	obu
Two	deux	ãnɔ̃	ɔɲɔ̃
Four	quatre	ãla	ãnda
Nine	neuf	nɛmbrɛ	nɔ̃mbrɔ̃
Ten	dix	n̥djɔ	n̥sjɔ̃

== Noun construction ==
English	sg.	pl.
Baby	ɛwɔ	e[s]wɔ
Child	lɔbɔle	ɔmrɔbɔ
Dog	adwa	adwakpã
Fish	sĩje	sĩjekpã
Male	kpese	ɛkpese
Man	kpã	akpã
Old man	kpẽŋkprɛ	akpãŋkprɛ
Rope	be	bakpã
Woman	ju	oju
