= Agbanon II =

King of Glidji from 1929 to 1972

King of Glidji
- Reign: 9 May 1929 – 23 February 1972
- Predecessor: Foli Huegbo
- Successor: Tonyo Foli Bebe XIV
- Born: Ambroise Kanyi Foley; 24 June 1898; Glidji, Togoland
- Died: 23 February 1972 (aged 73)

Agbanon II (Ambroise Kanyi Foley; 24 June 1898 – 23 February 1972) was King of Glidji from 1929 to 1972.

== Biography ==
=== Early life, education, and career ===
Ambroise Kanyi Foley was born in Glidji on 24 June 1898 to Joseph Kapo Adokou Foley and Marie Ahuefa Huessu of the royal family. Foley completed his primary education at the German school in Sebe, then the capital of Togoland, in 1914 and received a diploma from a German complimentary course in Lomé in 1916 with a distinction for "good performance" (Note: "In ganzen gut" in the original German.).

After graduation, Foley worked in Lomé at the vocational school and the Société commerciale de l'Ouest africain (West African Trading Company), at the John Walkden & Company shipping company in Dahomey, and as an accountant at Unilever in the Belgian Congo from 1926 to 1929. During a trip to Glidji on 9 May 1929, Foley was elected King of Glidji under the dynastic name Agbanon II as the successor to Foli Huegbo who died on 1922.

=== Relationship with French administration ===
Agbanon II's role as King of Glidji led to conflict with the French administration. While Agbanon II insisted that he held authority over Glidji and other villages including Aného, colonial Commissioner Auguste Bonnecarrère considered him a chief and said that his authority didn't extend beyond Glidji and its surroundings. Bonnecarrère sought to reduce Glidji's authority over Aného, so that it could be ruled by the Lawson family. After Bonnecarrère's commissionership ended in the early 1930s, the French administration began to treat the Adjigo and the Akagban as equals.

Agbanon II was elected as a member of the Council of Notables of Aného, which was presided by Frédéric Body Lawson V, on 8 March 1931. This, along with the decision to grant him an annual allowance of 2,500 francs, were done by the French administration in anticipation of gaining his trust and easing tensions between the Adjigo and the Akagban. The French administration spied on him until 1937 to limit British influence.

In 1937, Agbanon II was granted a tax remission and an annual allowance of 3,600 francs. In 1940, after the French administration were content with his loyalty to them, this allowance was increased to 6,000 francs. Sometime afterwards, Glidji was established as an autonomous canton, the role of king of Glidji was recognized as holding authority over Glidji and Aného, and the Lawson family were codified as vassals of Glidji.

=== Political involvement ===
From 1946 to 1951, Agbanon II was elected as a deputy to the Representative Assembly, serving as the president of the Administrative Commission and vice-president of the Social Commission. From 1960 to 1963, Agbanon II was elected as a deputy of the National Assembly, serving as vice-president of the Assembly’s bureau and president of the Commission on Institutional and Administrative Affairs, Justice, and Legislation (Commission des Affaires institutionnelles, administratives, de la Justice et de la Legislation). Starting on 29 March 1959, Agbanon II was a member of the Chamber of Commerce, Agriculture, and Industry of Togo (today the Togo Chamber of Commerce and Industry).

In the early 1950s, Agbanon II was noted as a leader in the Committee of Togolese Unity.

=== Death ===
Agbanon II died on 23 February 1972.

== Distinctions ==
Agbanon II was the first literate king of the Glidji kingdom, and was fluent in French, English, and German. Agbanon II's Histoire de Petit-Popo et du royaume Guin (History of Petit-Popo and the Guin kingdom) written in 1934 was the first published work about Togo written by a Togolese person.

Agbanon II was made a knight of the Order of the Black Star on November 1948 and an officer in December 1949. After Togolese independence, Agbanon II received the Grand Cross of the Order of Mono and was made a Grand Chancellor of the same honor. He was also made a "High Administrator of the National Order of Honour" (Haut-Administrateur de l'Ordre National d'Honneur).

== Notes ==
Regnal titles
Preceded by Huegbo	King of Glidji; 9 May 1929 – 23 February 1972	Succeeded by Tonyo Foli Bebe XIV
