= Order of Mono =

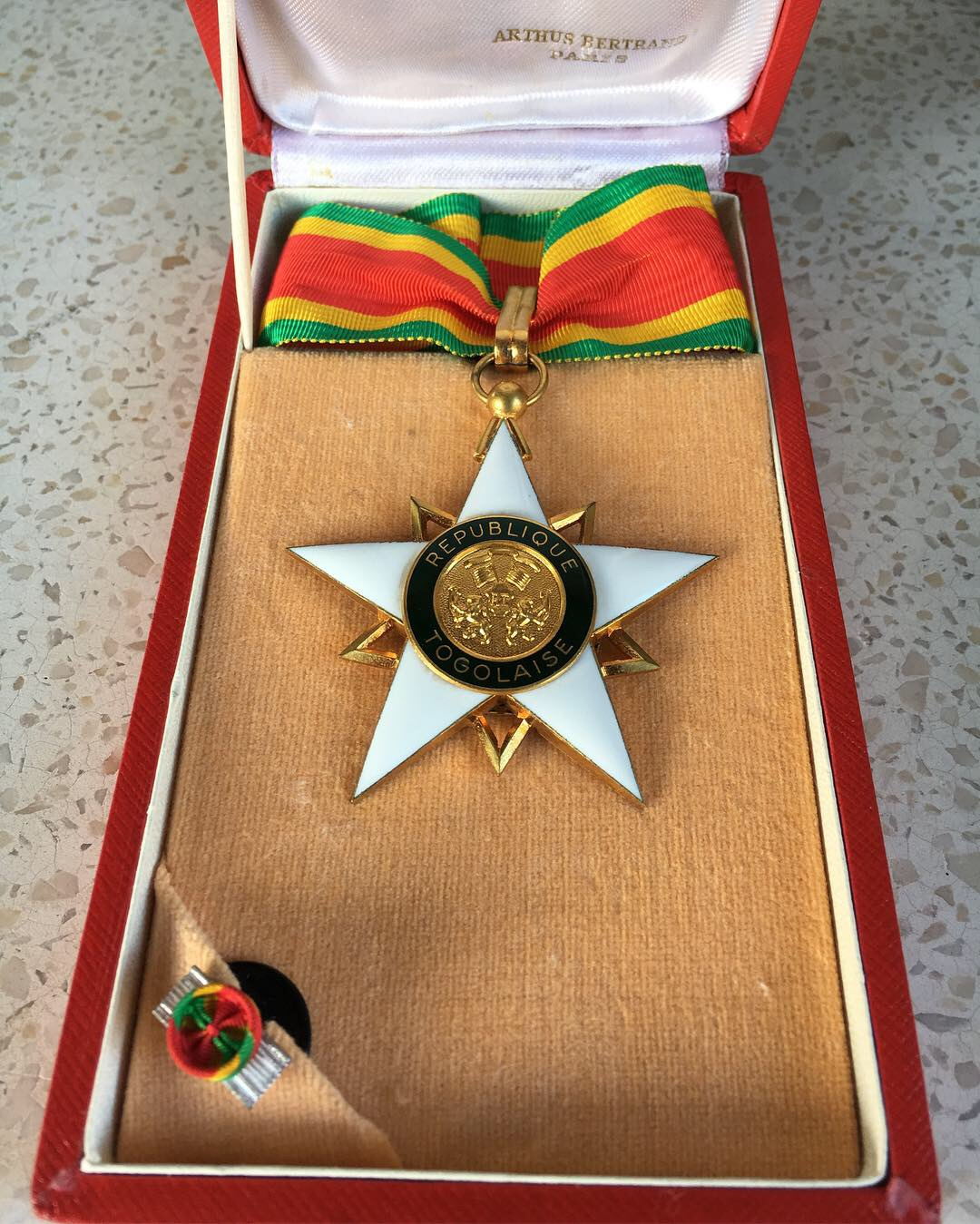
- Commander set of the Order of Mono

Awarded by Togo
- Type: Order of Merit
- Motto: Travail Liberte Patrie
- Eligibility: Military and civilian Togolese and foreigners
- Awarded for: Service to the nation of Togo, over a period of at least 15 years
- Grandmaster: President of the Togolese Republic
- Grades: Grand Cross; Grand Officer; Commander; Officer; Knight
- Ribbon bar of the order

The Order of Mono is the highest Togolese order of chivalry, established on September 2, 1961 by President Sylvanus Olympio. The order is named after the major river passing through the country: the Mono River. The Order of Mono consists of five grades, awarded to both Togolese civilians and military personnel, as well as to foreign nationals.

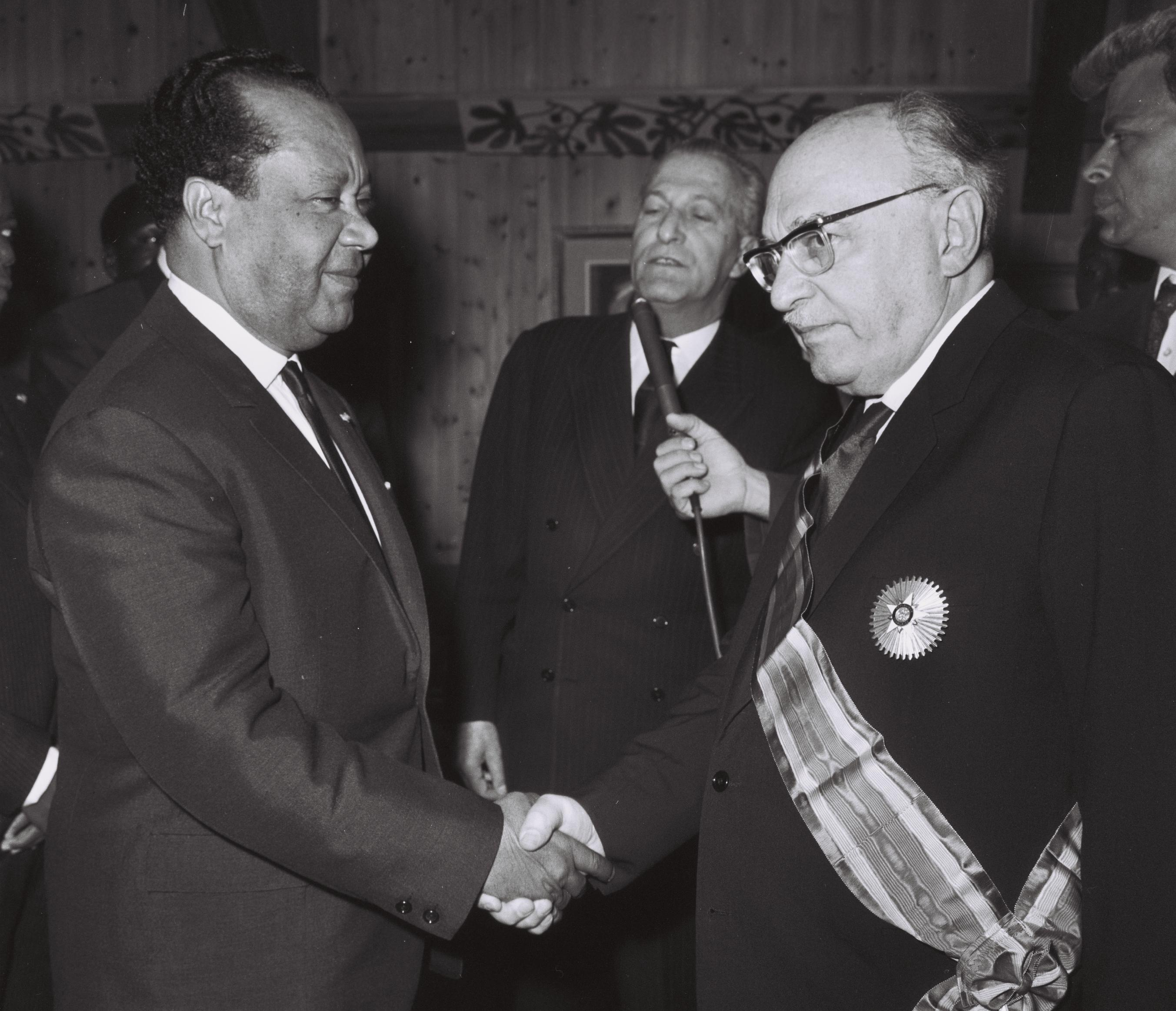
Nicolas Grunitzky decorating Zalman Shazar 1964

== Grades ==
The five grades of the Order of Mono are Grand Cross, Grand Officer, Commander, Officer and Knight, and only a limited number of Togolese citizens can be appointed to, and hold, each grade at any one time. The grade of Knight is limited to 1000 Togolese, 500 for Officer, 100 for Commander, 50 for Grand Officer and 10 for Grand Cross. Honorary awards, given to foreign nationals, do not count towards these limits.

Ribbons of the Order of Mono
Grand Cross	Grand Officer	Commander	Officer	Knight

== Notable recipients ==
- Lamine Diack
- Levi Eshkol
- Sandra Ablamba Johnson
- Kim Il Sung
- Ellen Johnson-Sirleaf
- Salim Ahmed Salim
- Haile Selassie
- Zalman Shazar
- Josip Broz Tito
- Jovanka Broz
- Agbanon II
- Fom Bot
- Dédé Rose Creppy

== See also ==
- Togo
- Togolese Armed Forces
- List of heads of state of Togo
- List of heads of government of Togo
