= Council of Notables (French Togoland) =

Political structure in French Togoland

The Council of Notables (French: Conseil des notables) was a political structure in French Togoland.

== History ==
On 17 February 1922, Commissioner Auguste Bonnecarrère signed Decree No. 32 which adapted the Council of Notables structure for colonial administration in French Togoland. Bonnecarrère intended for Councils of Notables in French Togoland to serve as a way to gauge local opinions prior to adopting measures which would affect the Togolese people. They were also intended as a way to involve the Togolese people in decision making as it was noted during the German administration that the native Togolese bourgeois were influential in local politics.

On 28 February 1922, the first Council of Notables was formed in Lomé. The council was presided by French administrator Jugla and had 16 members: Amoutivé canton chief Jacob Adjallé, Baguida canton chief Koudolo Gassu, neighborhood chiefs Octaviano Olympio, Albert Mensah, Félicien de Souza, Augustino de Souza, Jacques Trezise, and Théophile Tamakloé, familial heads Alfred Acolatsè, Charles Okpatta, William Prince Agbodja, Joseph Agbomson, Edouard Antony, John Atayi, Henri Mensah de Souza, and pastor Robert Domingo Baeta. Other Councils of Notables were created in French Togoland, such as in Anecho (modern-day Aného) on 8 March, Atakpamé on 31 May, Kpalimé on 27 June, Bassari (modern-day Bassar) and Sokodé on 11 January 1924, Lama-Kara (modern-day Kara) on 13 January 1928, and Sansanné-Mango (modern-day Mango) on 20 November 1931.

Some Togolese people considered the Council of Notables too passive, and called it "not able" as a play of words of the French word notable.

== Structure ==
As stated in Decree No. 32, Councils of Notables would contain between 8 and 16 members, depending on the district, who would be selected from esteemed local individuals by the Colonial Commissioner and presided over by the district's commander. Council members were unpaid and could serve for up to 3 years.

Councils of Notables met at least once per quarter, with the possibility for additional meetings at the discretion of the colonial Commissioner. Meetings were held at district offices, and were done with an interpreter and secretary who recorded meeting minutes. Councils were consulted on labor obligation rates and redemptions, tax assessments for indigenous businesses and markets, and other measures affecting their districts. Councils of Notables could only address agenda items put forth by the Commissioner and the council president, but council members could submit agenda items at any time which would be covered with approval from the Commissioner.
