= Point Coupee, Louisiana =

Unincorporated community in Louisiana, U.S.

Pointe Coupee
- Unincorporated community
- Location within the state of Louisiana Pointe Coupee (the United States)
- Coordinates: 30°44′4″N 91°25′59″W
- Country: United States
- State: Louisiana
- Parish: Pointe Coupee
- Elevation: 33 ft (10 m)
- Time zone: UTC-6 (Central (CST))
  - Summer (DST): UTC-5 (CDT)
- GNIS feature ID: 515083

Point Coupee is the name of an unincorporated community located in Pointe Coupee Parish, Louisiana, United States. It is the home of St. Francis Chapel and is located along Louisiana Highway 420, north of New Roads, the parish seat.

== History ==
The community was settled in 1719 by French colonists. It is one of the oldest European/western communities in the Mississippi River Valley. Originally, it was called Le Poste de Pointe Coupée (the Pointe Coupée Post or Cut Point Post). About 1776, a chemin neuf (new road) was built to connect the Mississippi River with False River. The area has since been known as New Roads and is the basis for naming the town of New Roads.

The Saint Francis Chapel at the Point Coupée settlement was originally completed in 1728. A new church building was constructed in 1760, but built too close to the Mississippi River. Flooding unearthed graves and the church was taken down, and a smaller version was erected using materials from the previous church. This newer structure was dedicated in 1895. The church is known as the fourth-oldest continuously operating Catholic church in Louisiana. St. Francis Chapel is now a mission church of St. Mary's of False River.

The town of St. Francisville, on the opposite (east) side of the Mississippi, is named for the St. Francis Chapel.

In 1792, when this area was part of New Spain, the Spanish suppressed the Mina Conspiracy near New Roads and four years later, during the Easter holiday, they suppressed a slave insurrection near Point Coupée, which became known as the Pointe Coupée Conspiracy That led to 23 heads of decapitated rebels being displayed on the road to New Orleans, and 31 additional slaves were flogged and sent to serve hard labor in other Spanish outposts.

== See also ==
- History of slavery in Louisiana
