= Mpra language =

Extinct language of Ghana

Mprɛ
- Mpra
- Pronunciation: [ḿpŕ̩ɛ̀]
- Native to: Ghana
- Region: Savannah Region
- Extinct: mid-20th century 5 rememberers (2007)
- Language family: Niger–Congo?: Atlantic–Congo; Volta–Congo; unclassified; Mprɛ

Language codes
- ISO 639-3: None (mis)
- Glottolog: mpra1235
- ELP: Mpra

Mpra or Mprɛ is an extinct language formerly spoken in the village of Butei (8°52′N 1°15′W) in central Ghana, located between the towns of Techiman and Tamale near the confluence of the Black and White Voltas. Mprɛ has been difficult to classify due to its divergent vocabulary. It is known from two word lists given in a 1931 article, and the other collected in 1956. Roger Blench considered it to be a possible language isolate, or alternatively a Kwa language.

Painter (1967) briefly states that "ḿpŕ̩ɛ̀ has died" and that the ethnic group ("the Nnyamase-mprɛ") have "become Nnyamase-Gonja"; he appears to regard it as having been a dialect of Gonja. However, this is based only on the numerals, which are clearly related to Gonja. The rest of the vocabulary is "hard to recognise". Blench presented it initially as a language isolate, but also as a possible Kwa language; he later notes that it "may either be an isolate with [Kwa] borrowings or a highly divergent branch of Kwa".

== Vocabulary ==
Allan Wolsey Cardinall collected 106 words of Mpra, which are presented below.

Mpra vocabulary
gloss	Mpra
God	agbem
it rains	agbem aba
earth	sunko
earth owner or tindana	suko kawuseggi
1	ekpe
2	enyo
3	eta
4	ena
5	enu
6	grume
7	ngpa
8	nenengene
9	gokpa
10	edu
11	edu bili mpe
12	edu bili nyo
13	edu bili ta
20	ado nyo
30	ado ta
100	kelafa
200	lefanyo
1000	agbu
cowrie	amuseraga
house	eso
cow	nogha
fowl	kohor
guinea-fowl	aiyili
manii	chonangsi
woman	ejo
child	nzui
father	chichi
mother	emo
son	nkemnzui
dog	tebe
goat	ade
water	nkaw
bow	etawa
arrow	ncho
fire	eja
it rains	agbemaba
yam	ampi
millet	avue
cassava	wanchi
corn	aboyin
beans	aza
nose	masuma
eyes	anisi
teeth	ate
tongue	nchuma
hair	nmin
hand	eno
arm	ebopa
leg	eputo
foot	eputo nasi
fingers	ataza
toe	atazai
cloth	busa
tree	eyia
kapok tree	ejini
native jumpers	kale
loincloth	dakor
elephant	ewogo
bush cow	zingilzinogha
lion	jikpajikpakoseggi
hartebeest	junga
roan	kol
waterbuck	bruguni
bushbuck	chankpala
reedbuck	kurunku
oribi	wulo
kob	volo
duiker	kukru
red-duiker	pumpu
bush pig	juro
hippopotamus	chaji
horse	vema
donkey	kwimi
black	ziri
white	fuli
red	ejuli
iron	epolebona
hoe	enwona
axe	etile
farm	ebaza
bush	zingelza
village	adebanza
fish	enchini
snake	ewoa
scorpion	lemma
locust	tintumba
bee	zinwi
honey	byunkonkon
bird	bobo
animal	abrimapre
leopard	jankamma
hyena	jingachi
bush-cat	bata
tobacco	asara
tail	edu
head	zekpa
skin	ekuli
mouth	nchumu
shea nut	gwizi
shea butter	ngu
Moon	nnopavo
sun	ezol
stars	achepreza

== Bibliography ==
- Blench, Roger. 2010. "Why is Africa so Linguistically Undiverse?". Language Isolates in Africa workshop, Lyon, December 3–4
- Cardinall, A. W. (1931). "A Survival" (PDF). The Gold Coast Review. 5 (1): 193–197.
- Painter, Colin (1967). "The Distribution of Guang in Ghana, and a Statistical Pre-Testing on Twenty-Five Idiolects". The Journal of West African Languages. 4 (1). Ibadan: Cambridge University Press: 25–78.
- Williamson, Kay; Blench, Roger (2000). "Niger-Congo". In Heine, Bernd; Nurse, Derek (eds.). African languages: an introduction. Cambridge [England] ; New York: Cambridge University Press. ISBN 978-0-521-66178-2.
- Blench, Roger (2013-03-15), Recovering data on Mpra [=Mpre] a possible language isolate in North-Central Ghana (PDF), manuscript
- Blench, Roger (n.d.), Niger-Congo: an alternative view (PDF), archived from the original on 2012-12-03
