= Mina (Louisiana) =

Former African-American community in Louisiana sharing a common language

The Mina were a community of well-organized, enslaved Black people in Louisiana who spoke a common language, most likely a dialect of Ewe that may have been related to Fon.

== The Mina ==
Though some historians include the Mina with enslaved Africans sold from Elmina on the Gold Coast, other historians believe they were Ewe people from the Bight of Benin. As part of how some Louisiana slave-holders managed enslaved people at the time, the maintenance of African linguistic–ethnic communities was tolerated and even encouraged. The Pointe Coupée Mina community arose following their enslavement and importation into Louisiana following 1782. Among enslaved Africans whose ethnicity was recorded in official documents between 1719 and 1820, Mina were the third-largest enslaved ethnic group in Louisiana.

Many Mina took part in the Pointe Coupée Slave Conspiracy of 1791.

== See also ==
- Pointe Coupée Slave Conspiracy of 1795
