= Allan Wolsey Cardinall =

British colonial administrator

Sir Allan Wolsey Cardinall, KBE, CMG (21 March 1887 – 26 January 1956) was a British colonial administrator. He was Governor of the Falkland Islands from 1941 to 1946.
