= Woold Homé =

Home of an English slave trader

Coordinates: 6°12′13.63349″N 1°28′36.95131″E

Woold Homé, or the home of Woold, a British slave trader, is located in southern Togo. It was a site where enslaved African people awaiting their embarkation were confined during the clandestine slave trade. This house was used for illegal trafficking until 1852.

== World Heritage Status ==
This site was added to the UNESCO World Heritage Tentative List on January 8, 2002, in the Cultural category. It was restored in 2006. Its current owner is Chief Assiakoley.

== See also ==
- Slave Coast of West Africa
