= Owoo =

Owoo is a surname. Notable people with the surname include:

- James Owoo (born 1927), Ghanaian athlete
- Nii Kwate Owoo (born 1944), Ghanaian academic and filmmaker

== See also ==
- The Owoo family, claimed original owners of the land of the Achimota Forest
