= Abidji people =

Ethnic group in Ivory Coast

The Abidji are an Akan people who live in the Ivory Coast.
