= Pointe Coupée Slave Conspiracy of 1791 =

Slave rebellion in North America

On June 25, 1791, a group of enslaved Mina gathered on the estate of the widow Robillard in New Roads, Pointe Coupée Parish. Jean-Louis, who was enslaved there, organized regular balls for Mina men. During the gathering, a plan was made for the Mina to rise up and free themselves, gathering pickaxes, knives, and other weapons to mount an attack on a storekeeper who could be raided for guns, gunpowder, shot, and other weapons. The only two non-Mina people involved were Cæsar, from Jamaica (ethnically an Ashanti), and Pedro Chamba, who was ethnically Chamba but had been raised by the Mina.

== Conspiracy ==
The conspirators planned to launch the attack on the night of July 7, 1791, but poor weather and the need to gather Mina from other plantations in Pointe Coupée delayed the uprising until July 9. With the delay, Jacó attempted to enlist additional supporters, including an enslaved man named Dique. Dique was hesitant to join the conspiracy and confided in Venus, who like him was Ado, not Mina. Venus did not trust the Mina and reported the plans to her slave holder, Georges Oliveau, who in turn passed word to an officer of the local militia.

The militia posted guards on roads throughout the area and dispatched troops to capture the conspirators. In total, 17 enslaved men, including Jacó, were arrested and sent to New Orleans for trial. Their trial began in March 1792, but the Spanish colonial officials lacked interpreters necessary for the witnesses and defendants who spoke only French or Creole. By June 1794, 16 of the conspirators (one had drowned himself before reaching New Orleans), were returned to the plantations where they were enslaved.

In reaction to the attempted revolt, Governor Carondelet ordered slave holders to control people in bondage in a more "humane" manner, as well as to provide better food and clothing. However, these efforts were not enough to avoid the Pointe Coupée Slave Conspiracy of 1795.

== See also ==
- History of slavery in Louisiana
- Pointe Coupée Conspiracy
