= Lake Togo =

Coordinates: 6.25°N 1.42°E

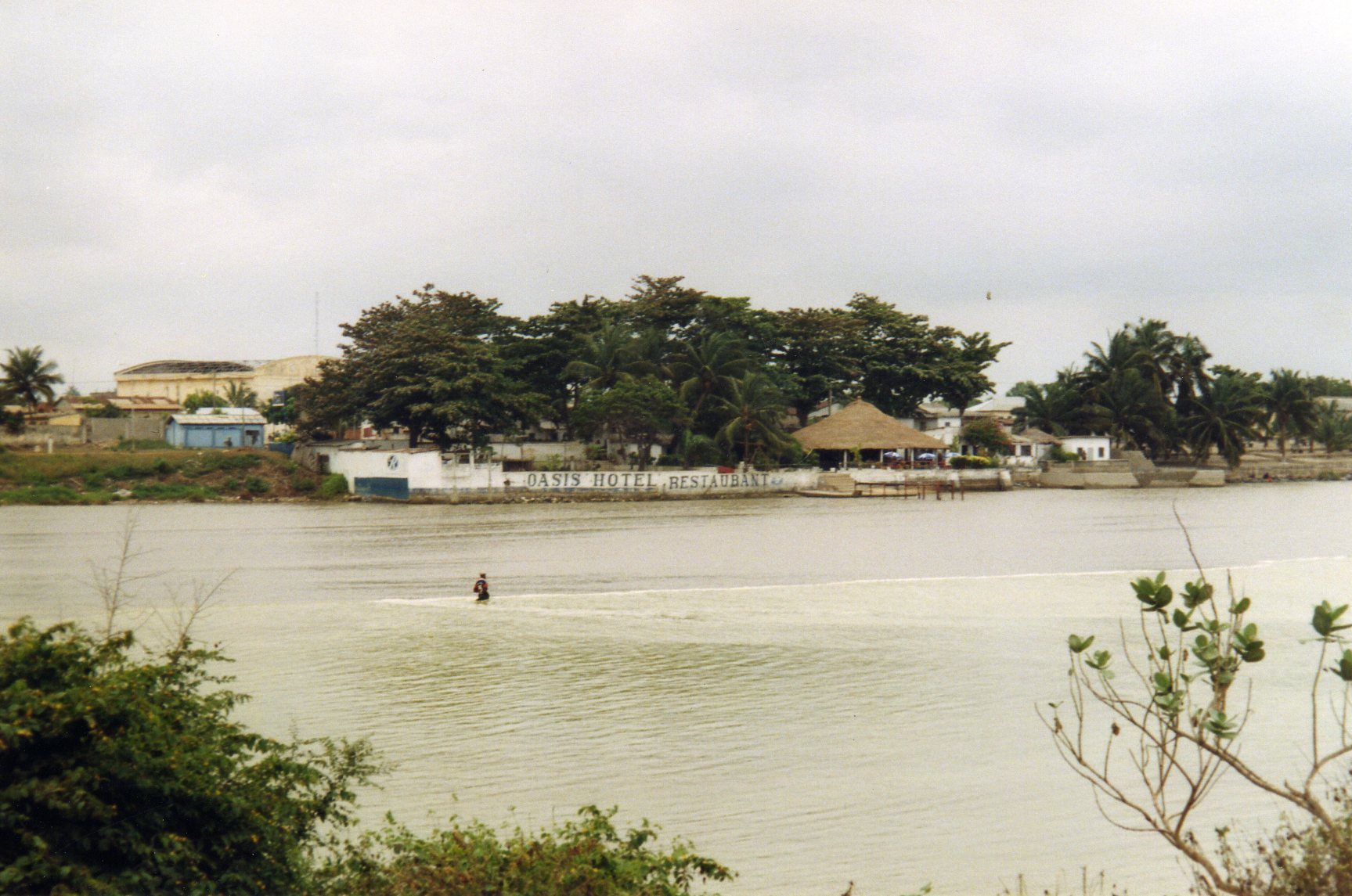
View over the lagoon in Aného, Togo

Lake Togo (French: Lac Togo) is the largest part of a lagoon in Togo, separated from the Atlantic Ocean by a narrow coastal strip. It is shallow and a popular location for water sports. Towns on the lake's shore include Agbodrafo and Togoville. Transport on the lake is generally by pirogue.

== Lake Togo Origin ==
Lake Togo is about 15 km (9.3 mi) long, 6 km (3.7 mi) wide and 64 km² in area. It receives water from the Sio River in the southwest and various other smaller streams to the west and east and the Haho River enters from the north. The lake is separated from the sea by a sandbar a kilometre or so wide. Water exits to the east through a canal-like extension where it receives water from the nearby, smaller Lake Vogan, and continues into the lagoonal system along the coast.

A main road traverses the coast to the south of the lake and local roads circle the lake, connecting the small villages. The area is not heavily populated and there is little tourism. The economy depends on extensive agriculture and fishing, with seine nets being used and fish sold in local towns. Coconuts are grown between the lake and the coast, and there are plantations of coconut and oil palms on the flood plains to the north of the lake.

== Wildlife ==
Lake Togo, together with the nearby smaller Lake Vogan and various coastal lagoons, makes up an important area for birds. They are surrounded by floodplains which are covered with typical floodplain grasses, and Phragmites and Typha occur in wetter depressions. There are no mangroves because these lagoons are not tidal. At times when flood water is present in the lagoons, the fast-growing water cabbage (Pistia stratiotes) appears.

The lake, wetlands, lagoons, and coastal sands of this area provide resting places for migrant water birds and terns on their routes down the west side of Africa. Fish in the lake are of both marine and riverine origins, and the most common species are Tilapia and the carfish Chrysichthys. Invertebrates include the gastropod molluscs Pachymelania spp. and Tympanotonos fuscatus and the crustaceans Farfantepenaeus duorarum and Callinectes latimanus.
