= History of slavery in Louisiana =

Regional history of slavery in the US

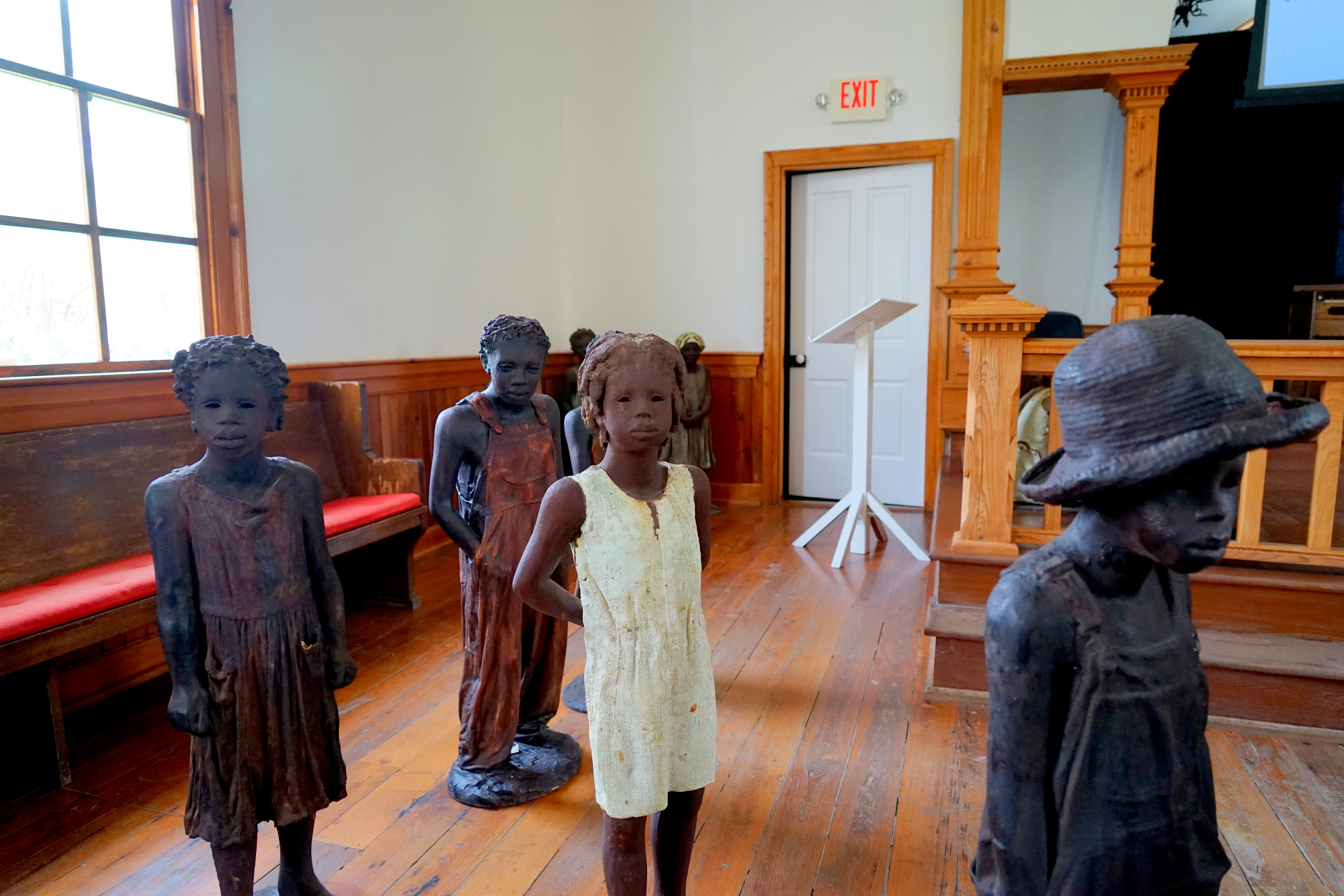
Exhibit inside the Slavery Museum at Whitney Plantation Historic District, St. John the Baptist Parish, Louisiana

Following Robert Cavelier de La Salle establishing the French claim to the territory and the introduction of the name Louisiana, the first settlements in the southernmost portion of Louisiana (New France) were developed at present-day Biloxi (1699), Mobile (1702), Natchitoches (1714), and New Orleans (1718). Chattel slavery was then established by European colonists.

The institution was maintained by the Spanish (1763–1801) when the area was part of New Spain, by the French when they briefly reacquired the colony (1801–1803), and by the United States following the Louisiana Purchase of 1803. Due to its complex history, Louisiana had a very different pattern of slavery compared to the rest of the United States.

== French rule (1699–1763) ==
Chattel slavery was introduced by French colonists in Louisiana in 1706, when they made raids on the Chitimacha settlements. Thousands of indigenous people were killed, and the surviving women and children were taken as slaves. The enslavement of natives, including the Atakapa, Bayogoula, Natchez, Choctaw, Chickasaw, Taensa, and Alabamon peoples, would continue throughout the history of French rule. While Native American peoples had sometimes made slaves of enemies captured in war, they also tended to adopt them into their tribes and incorporate them among their people.

The French introduced African slaves to the territory in 1710, after capturing a number as plunder during the War of the Spanish Succession. Trying to develop the new territory, the French transported more than 2,000 Africans to New Orleans between 1717 and 1721, on at least eight ships. The death toll for African and native slaves was high, with scurvy and dysentery widespread because of poor nutrition and sanitation. Although sailors also suffered from scurvy, slaves were subject to more shipboard diseases owing to overcrowding. Historian Pekka Hämäläinen writes that, by 1730, 60% of the population of the colony were slaves (both Indigenous and African in origin).

In 1731, the African Bambara slave population conspired to rebel against slavery and the French colonial authorities in a plot linked to the indigenous Natchez revolt of 1729 and subsequent events. However, the historicity of the plot is disputed.

== Spanish rule (1763–1803) ==
Alejandro O'Reilly re-established Spanish rule in 1768, and issued a decree on December 7, 1769, which banned the trade of Native American slaves. The wording of his decree banning trade of enslaved indigenous people, however, did not require slaveholders to free enslaved Native Americans or their enslaved descendants. There was no movement toward abolition of the African slave trade, and by the 1773 census enslavers began reporting holding "part-Indian negro" slaves and thus ensuring they could remain enslaved.

The introduction of the Spanish practice of coartación, which allowed enslaved people to buy their freedom and that of other slaves, was opposed by Governor Bernardo de Gálvez and, because of long-standing prohibitions limiting their ability to accumulate wealth, enslaved people were unlikely to be able to purchase their freedom. Spanish laws also gave enslaved people some access to the courts to enforce their rights.

Spain also shipped Romani slaves to Louisiana.

A group of maroons led by Jean Saint Malo resisted re-enslavement from their base in the swamps east of New Orleans between 1780 and 1784.

Two attempted slave rebellions took place in Pointe Coupée Parish during Spanish rule in 1790s, the Pointe Coupée Slave Conspiracy of 1791 and the Pointe Coupée Slave Conspiracy of 1795, which led to the suspension of the slave trade and a public debate among planters and the Spanish authorities about proper slave management.

== U.S. Territory of New Orleans (1804–1812) ==
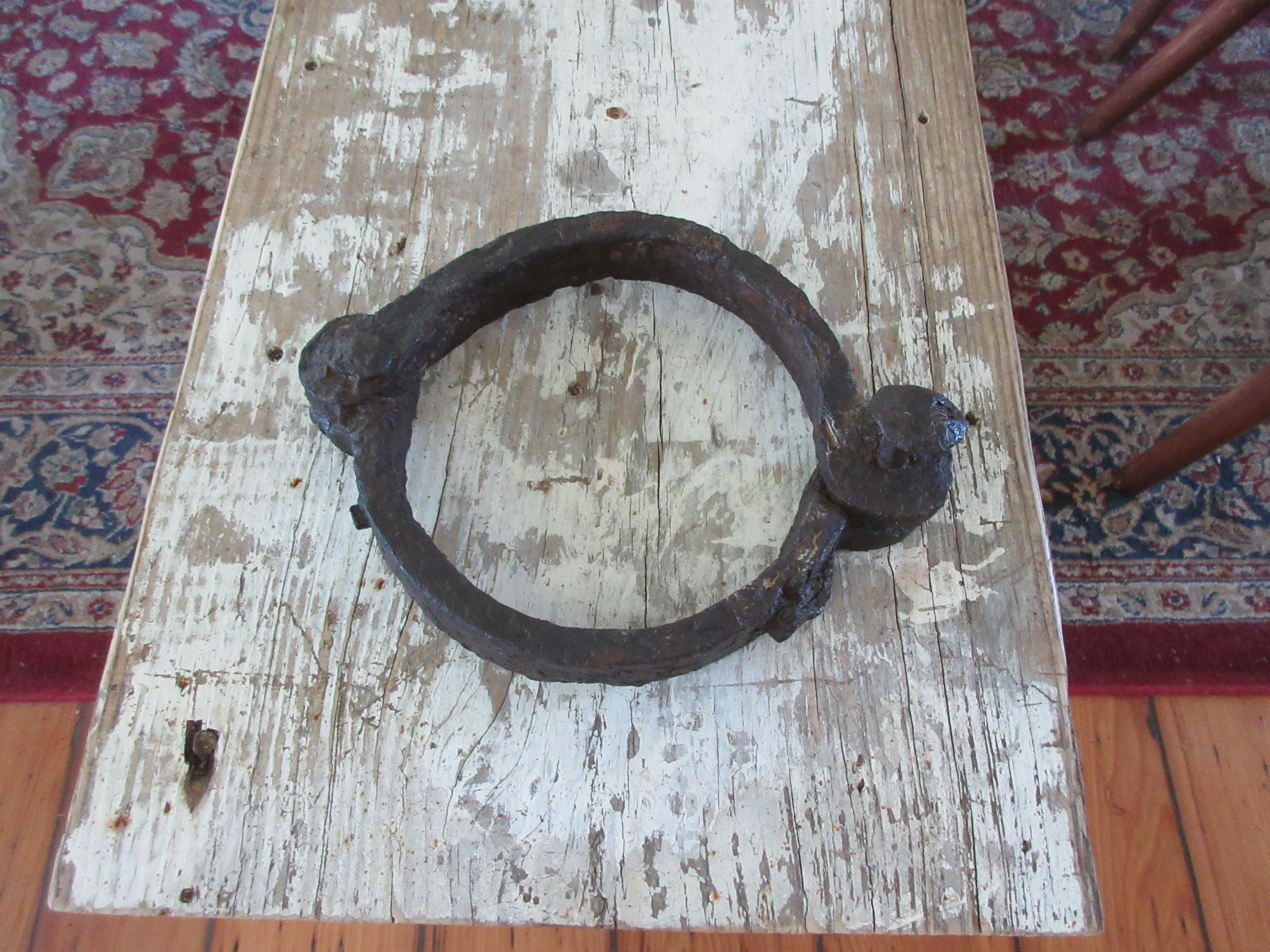
Slave shackle found while digging in a property on Baronne Street in New Orleans; donated to the Kid Ory Historic House museum

The demand for slaves increased in Louisiana and other parts of the Deep South after the invention of the cotton gin (1793) and the Louisiana Purchase (1803). The cotton gin allowed the processing of short-staple cotton, which thrived in the upland areas. It made possible a new commodity crop in northern Louisiana, although sugar cane continued to be predominant in southern Louisiana. The Mississippi River Delta area in southeast Louisiana created the ideal alluvial soil necessary for the growing of sugar cane; sugar was the state's prime export during the antebellum period.

The United States banned the importation of slaves in 1807–08. A brisk domestic slave trade developed; many thousands of black slaves were sold by slaveholders in the Upper South to buyers in the Deep South, in what amounted to a significant forced migration.

Early in 1811, before the U.S. Territory of Orleans was admitted to the Union as the state of Louisiana, the largest slave revolt in American history began about thirty miles outside of New Orleans (or a greater distance if traveled alongside the twisting Mississippi River), as slaves rebelled against the brutal work regimens of sugar plantations. There had been a sizable influx of refugee French planters from the former French colony of Saint-Domingue following the Haitian Revolution (1791–1804), who brought some of their slaves of African descent with them. This influence was likely a contributing factor in the revolt. The German Coast Uprising ended with white militias and soldiers hunting down black slaves, peremptory tribunals or trials in three parishes (St. Charles, St. John the Baptist, and Orleans), execution of many of the rebels, and the public display of their severed heads.

== Statehood and the U.S. Civil War (1812–1865) ==
In Louisiana, uniquely among the slave states, enslaved people were classed as personal property rather than real property.

The New Orleans slave market was the single most important slave market in the United States. One historian described the scene: "In the fashionable streets of the business quarter there were slave barracks, slave show-rooms, slave auction-houses. In some of these establishments negroes attractively attired were exhibited in show windows or on verandahs, precisely as one might offer any other kind of merchandise for public inspection. In 1842 there were 185 persons listed in the city directory as engaged in the business, not counting 349 brokers and 25 auctioneers, who probably also sold slaves whenever the opportunity offered. This was in a city the white population of which did not exceed 60,000 souls."

In 1857, Louisiana banned individual manumission, meaning slave owners could not independently free their slaves, it required court or legislative intervention.

Slavery was officially abolished in the portion of the state under Union control by the state constitution of 1864, during the American Civil War. Slavery had already been abolished in the remainder of the state by President Abraham Lincoln's 1863 Emancipation Proclamation, which provided that slaves located in territories which were in rebellion against the United States were free. In some areas, slaves left the plantations to seek Union military lines for freedom. If such lines were located too far away, they were often held in servitude until the Union gained control of the South.

== Differences between slavery in Louisiana and other states ==
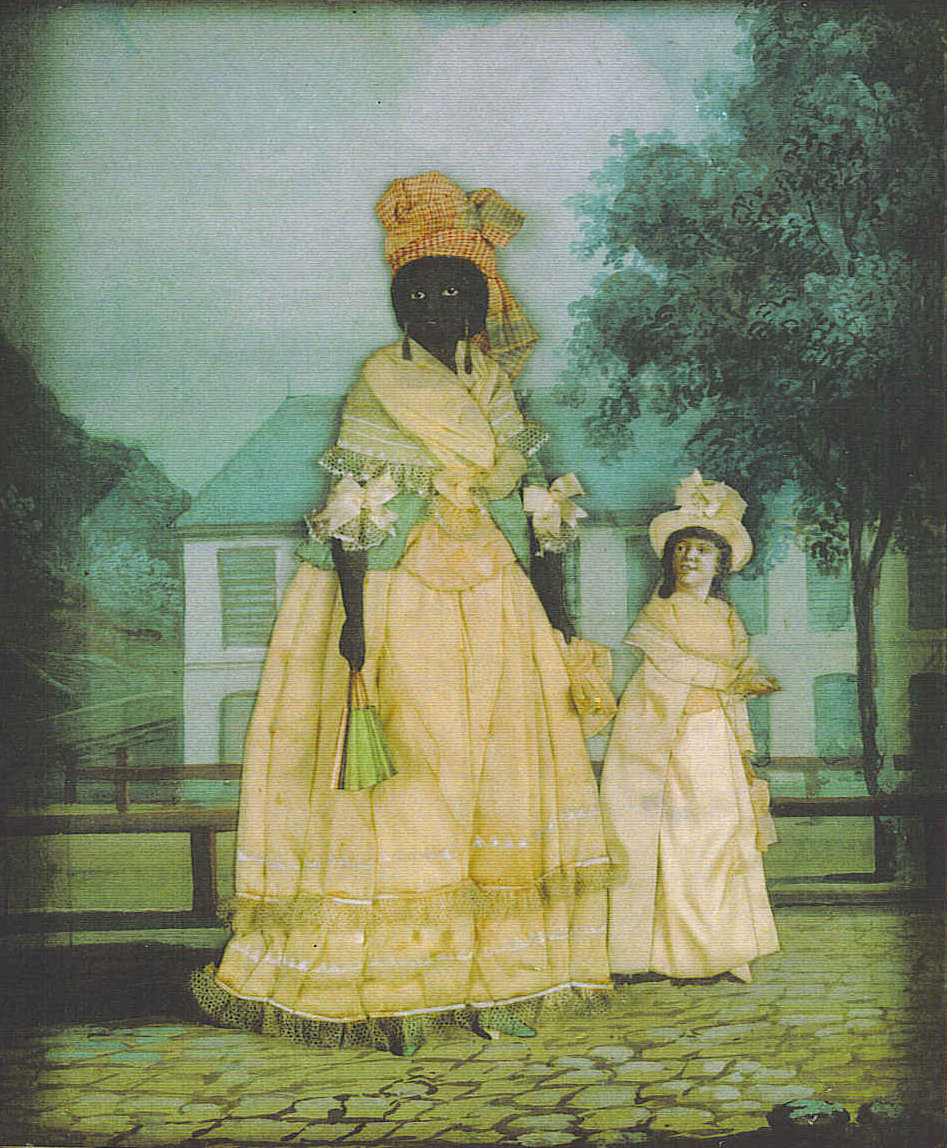
Free woman of color with quadroon daughter. Late 18th-century collage painting, New Orleans.

Louisiana had a markedly different pattern of slave trading compared to other states in the American South as a result of its French and Spanish heritage. The origin of the slaves brought in by slave traders were primarily Senegal, the Bight of Benin and the Congo region, which differed to that of states such as Alabama, Tennessee and Mississippi, where the enslaved were culturally African-American after having resided in the United States for at least two generations. After the Louisiana Purchase, an influx of slaves and free blacks from the United States occurred.

Secondly, Louisiana's slave trade was governed by the French Code Noir, and later by its Spanish equivalent the Código Negro. As written, the Code Noir gave specific rights to slaves, including the right to marry. Although it authorized and codified cruel corporal punishment against slaves under certain conditions, it forbade slave owners to torture them. It forbade separation of married couples, and separation of young children from their mothers. It also required the owners to instruct slaves in the Catholic faith, implying that Africans were human beings endowed with a soul, an idea that had not been acknowledged until then.

Together with a more permeable historic French system related to the status of gens de couleur libres (free people of color), often born to white fathers and their mixed-race partners, a far higher percentage of African Americans in the state of Louisiana were free as of the 1830 census (13.2% in Louisiana, compared to 0.8% in Mississippi, whose dominant population was white Anglo-American). The free people of color were on average exceptionally literate, with a significant number of them owning businesses, properties, and even slaves.

The Code Noir also forbade interracial marriages, but interracial relationships were formed in New Orleans society. The mulattoes became an intermediate social caste between the whites and the blacks, while in the Thirteen Colonies mulattoes and blacks were considered socially equal and discriminated against on an equal basis.

When control of Louisiana shifted to the United States, the Catholic social norms were deeply rooted in Louisiana; the contrast with predominantly Protestant parts of the young nation, where differing norms prevailed, was evident. The Americanization of Louisiana resulted in the mulattoes being considered as black, and free blacks were regarded as undesirable. Moreover, the aim of Code Noir to restrict the population expansion of free blacks and people of color was successful as the number of gratuitous emancipations in the period before 1769 averaged about one emancipation per year.

Louisiana also granted the enslaved the right to purchase their own freedom, which was a legacy of the Spanish system and was called coartación.

== See also ==
- Pointe Coupée Slave Conspiracy of 1791
- Pointe Coupée Slave Conspiracy of 1795
- 1811 German Coast Uprising
  - Charles Deslondes, a leader of the slave revolt
- Black Indians in the United States
- List of plantations in Louisiana
- Louisiana African American Heritage Trail
  - Whitney Plantation Historic District, first museum in the U.S. dedicated to slavery
- Solomon Northup, author of Twelve Years a Slave (1853)
- Delphine LaLaurie (d. 1849), infamous for abuse of her French Quarter mansion's slaves
- John McDonogh (d. 1850), New Orleanian who manumitted slaves and funded antebellum education
- Jean Baptiste Moussier, New Orleans slave trader
- History of slavery in Texas
- Slavery in New France
- African Americans in Louisiana
- Slavery in the United States
- History of slavery in the United States by state
- Prayer kettle
