= Dangme language =

Kwa language of Ghana

Dangme
- Dangbe
- Native to: Ghana
- Region: South-eastern Ghana, east of Accra
- Ethnicity: Dangbe
- Native speakers: 1,020,000 (2013)
- Language family: Niger–Congo?: Atlantic–Congo; Volta-Congo; Kwa; Ga-Dangme; Dangme
- Writing system: Latin (Dangbe alphabet)

Official status
- Official language in: Ghana

Language codes
- ISO 639-2: ada
- ISO 639-3: ada
- Glottolog: adan1247

The Dangme language, also written Dangbe or Dangbɛ, and less properly Adangme, Dangbe or Adaŋgbi, is a Kwa language spoken in south-eastern Ghana by the Dangme people (Dangmeli). They are part of the larger Ga-Dangme ethnic group. Klogbi is a variant, spoken by the Kloli (Klo or Krobo People). Kropp Dakubu (1987) is the most thorough grammar of the language.

== Classification ==
Adangme is a Kwa language, part of the Niger–Congo family. It is closely related to Ga, and together they form the Ga–Dangme branch within Kwa.

== Geographic distribution ==
Adangme is spoken in Ghana by over 800,000 people as of 2004.

It is the aboriginal language spoken in Ghana, Togo, and Benin by the people of Ada, Osudoku, Manya Krobo, Yilo Krobo, Shai, Ningo, Prampram and Kpone. Adangme is partly mutually intelligible with Ga, and, to a lesser extent, Ewe. Nevertheless, many Adangme people also speak or understand at least one of these languages, painting the relationship as asymmetric. Adangme as a school subject is taught in the Adangme areas.

The land of these related tribes stretched from the Greater Accra Region to the Eastern Region of Ghana, northward to the Akwapim hills and has all the Adangmeland on the east and the Ga to the west of it. Bawaleshi, which is about 4.8 kilometres (3.0 mi) southwest of Dodowa, is the last Adangme town which is close to the Akwapim and the Ga boundaries. There are six main dialects which coincide with political units. The coastal dialects are Ada, Ningo and Prampram (Gbugbla). The inland dialects are Shai (Sɛ), Krobo (Klo) and Osudoku.

== Phonology ==
=== Consonants ===
Consonant phonemes
| | | Labial | Alveolar | Palatal | Velar | Labial-velar |
|---|---|---|---|---|---|---|
| Nasal | | m | n | ɲ | ŋ | ŋ͡m |
| Plosive/ Affricate | voiceless | p | t | t͡ʃ | k | k͡p |
| Plosive/ Affricate | voiced | b | d | d͡ʒ | ɡ | ɡ͡b |
| Fricative | voiceless | f | s | | | |
| Fricative | voiced | v | z | | | |
| Approximant | | | l | j | | w |

- /m, p, b/ are bilabial, whereas /f, v/ are labiodental.
- /p, b, t, d, k, g/ are singly articulated plosives, /t͡ʃ, d͡ʒ/ are affricates (stops with a strong fricative release), whereas /k͡p, ɡ͡b/ are doubly articulated plosives.
- /l/ varies between a lateral approximant [l] and a central trill [r].
- /j/ has a fricative allophone [ʒ].

=== Vowels ===
Monophthongs of Dangme, from Kropp Dakubu (1987:15)

Dangme has 7 oral vowels and 5 nasal vowels.

| | Front | | Back | |
| | oral | nasal | oral | nasal |
|---|---|---|---|---|
| Close | i | ĩ | u | ũ |
| Close-mid | e | | o | |
| Open-mid | ɛ | ɛ̃ | ɔ | ɔ̃ |
| Open | a | ã | | |

- The front vowels are unrounded, whereas the back vowels are rounded.
- /i, u/ are slightly more open than /ĩ, ũ/.
- /e, o/ are close-mid [e, o]. They do not have nasal counterparts.
- /ɛ̃, ɔ̃/ are open-mid [ɛ̃, ɔ̃], whereas /ɛ, ɔ/ are somewhat lower (near-open) [æ, ɔ̞].
- The nasal /ã/ is open front [ã], whereas the oral /a/ is slightly retracted (near-front) [a̠].

=== Tones ===
Dangme has three tones: high, mid and low. Like many West African languages, it has tone terracing.

=== Phonotactics ===
The possible syllable structures are V, CV, or CCV where the second consonant is /l/.

== Writing system ==
Dangme is written in the Latin script, with the addition of the letters ɛ, ɔ, and ŋ. Tones are not normally written.

Orthographic and phonemic correspondences include the following:

- j - /dʒ/
- ŋ - /ŋ/
- ŋm - /ŋm/
- ny - /ɲ/
- ts - /tʃ/
- y - /j/
- ɛ - /ɛ/
- ɔ - /ɔ/

== Sample text ==
The following text is Article 1 of the Universal Declaration of Human Rights.

Adesahi tsuo ɔ, a bɔ mɛ nɛ nɔ fɛɛ nɔ e ye e he, nɛ nɔ tsuaa nɔsɔ ngɛ odehe si himi kɛ he blɔhi a blɔ fa mi. A bɔ mɛ kɛ nɔ́ se kɔmi kɛ he nule juɛmi, nɛ e hia kaa nɔ fɛɛ nɔ nɛ e na nyɛmi suɔmi kɛ ha nɔ tsuaa nɔ.

== Bibliography ==
- Kropp Dakubu, M. E., ed. (1977). West African Language Data Sheets. Vol. 1. West African Linguistic Society.
- Kropp Dakubu, M. E. (1987). The Dangme Language: An Introductory Survey. London: Macmillan.
- Kropp Dakubu, M. E., ed. (1988). The Languages of Ghana. London: Kegan Paul International for the International African Institute. ISBN 0-7103-0210-X.
- Language Guide. Accra: Bureau of Ghana Languages 4th Edition. 1977.
