= Glidji =

Canton in Maritime, Togo

- Canton
- Location in Togo
- Coordinates: 6°14′55″N 1°36′0″E
- Country: Togo
- Region: Maritime
- Prefectures: Lacs

Glidji is a canton of the Lacs prefecture in the Maritime region of Togo.

== History ==
Glidji was established between 1683 and 1687 by Ofori as the capital of the Glidji kingdom.
