= Aného =

Aného Little Popo
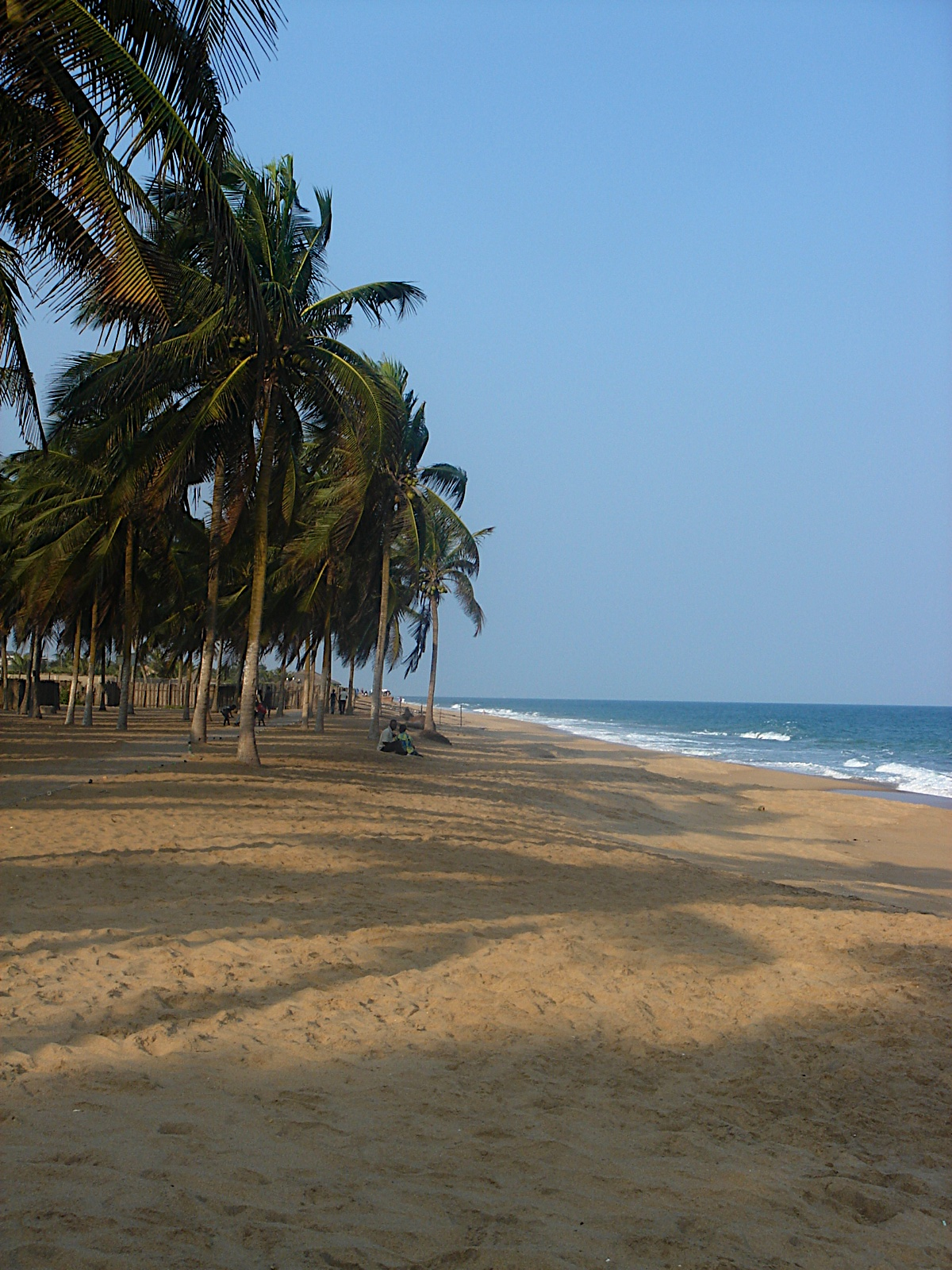
- A beach in Aného

- Location in Togo
- Coordinates: 6°14′0″N 1°36′0″E
- Country: Togo
- Region: Maritime

Aného, previously known as Anecho, Petit Popo or Little Popo, is a town in southeastern Togo, lying on the Gulf of Guinea near the border of Benin. It is situated 45 km east of the capital Lomé, between the Atlantic Ocean and Lake Togo in Maritime Region.

== History ==
Founded in the late 17th century by Ane people fleeing from Denkyira attacks in Elmina (now in Ghana), Aného developed as a Portuguese slave market and commercial center. The town sheltered Ofori, the king of Accra, after his kingdom was conquered by the Akwamu Kingdom. Little Popo suffered the same fate in April 1702.

It was the capital of German Togoland from 1885 to 1887.The nearby town of Zebe became the second capital of German Togoland in 1887. It gradually declined in importance after the capital was transferred to Lomé in 1897, a decline exacerbated by coastal erosion. Aneho was the capital of the French occupation from 1914 to 1920.

Aného remains an important intellectual center for Togo, though it has not grown as rapidly as Togo’s other major cities. Its estimated population in 2005 was 25,400.

== Attractions ==
The town's main industries are farming and fishing, while it is still a center for Voodoo. Notable buildings include Aneho Protestant Church (built in 1895) and Aneho Peter and Paul Church, cathedral of the Roman Catholic Diocese of Aného, dating from 1898. These buildings were together added to the UNESCO Tentative List on December 12, 2000, in the Cultural category.

== Climate ==
Climate data for Aneho (1991-2020)
Month	Jan	Feb	Mar	Apr	May	Jun	Jul	Aug	Sep	Oct	Nov	Dec	Year
Average precipitation mm (inches)	4.2 (0.17)	22.1 (0.87)	58.6 (2.31)	112.9 (4.44)	155.9 (6.14)	206.4 (8.13)	102.8 (4.05)	49.7 (1.96)	73.3 (2.89)	83.7 (3.30)	30.0 (1.18)	9.7 (0.38)	909.3 (35.80)
Average precipitation days (≥ 1 mm)	0.7	1.4	3.6	5.7	8.6	10.3	6.3	4.2	5.7	6.3	3.1	1.0	56.9
Source: NOAA

== See also ==
- Woold Homé
- Slave Coast of West Africa
