= Gã-Dangme languages =

Language spoken in Ghana and Togo

Gã-Dangme
- Geographic distribution: Ghana and Togo
- Linguistic classification: Niger–Congo?: Atlantic–Congo; Volta-Congo; Kwa; Gã-Dangme
- Proto-language: Proto-Ga-Dangme
- Subdivisions: Gã; Dangme

Language codes
- Glottolog: gada1257

Gã-Dangme is a branch of the Kwa language family. Gã-Dangme is made up of just two languages: Gã and Dangme. They are closely related and have sometimes been considered as a single language. There are many similarities in the basic vocabulary. There are also many words that are different, and grammatical differences, particularly in the verb phrase. Where they differ, Dangme is said to usually be closer to the original Proto-Gã-Dangme than Gã.

== Comparative numerals ==
Numbers in different varieties of Gã-Dangme languages are:

Gloss	Gã	Dangme	Proto- Gã-Dangme
'1'	ékòmé	kákē	*-kɔ̃
'2'	éɲɔ̀	éɲɔ̃̀	*é-ɲɔ
'3'	étɛ̃	étɛ̃̄	*é-tɛ̃
'4'	éɟwɛ̀	éywɛ̀~ éwìɛ̀	
'5'	énùmɔ̃	énũ̄ɔ̃̄	*é-nũ
'6'	ék͡pàa	ék͡pà	*é-k͡pàa
'7'	k͡pàwo	k͡pààɡō	*k͡pàa-kɔ̃
'8'	k͡pàaɲɔ̃	k͡pàaɲɔ̃̄	*k͡pàa-ɲɔ
'9'	nɛ̀ɛhṹ	nɛ̃̀ɛ̃́	*nɛɛ
'10'	ɲɔ̀ŋmá	ɲɔ̃̀ŋ͡mã́	*ɲɔŋma <*ɲɔ̃+k͡pa
