= Gã language =

Kwa language spoken in Ghana

Ga
- Gã
- Pronunciation: [ɡã]
- Native to: Ghana
- Region: South-eastern Ghana, around Accra
- Ethnicity: Ga
- Native speakers: 745,000 (2016)
- Language family: Niger–Congo?: Atlantic–Congo; Volta-Congo; Kwa; Ga–Dangme; Ga
- Writing system: Latin (Ga alphabet); Ghanaian braille

Official status
- Official language in: None; Government-sponsored language in Ghana.

Language codes
- ISO 639-2: gaa
- ISO 639-3: gaa
- Glottolog: gaaa1244

Samuel Okpoti speaking Ga in Ghana.

Gã, also spelled Ga or Gan, is a Kwa language, part of the Niger–Congo family, spoken in Ghana, mainly in and around the capital Accra, by the Gã people. There are also some speakers in Togo, Benin and western Nigeria. It has a phonemic distinction between three vowel lengths.

== Classification ==
Gã is a Kwa language, part of the Niger–Congo family. It is very closely related to Adangme, and together they form the Gã–Dangme branch.

Gã is the predominant language of the Gã people, an ethnic group of Ghana. Ethnic Gã family names (surnames) include Owoo, Lartey, Lomo, Nortey, Aryee, Lamptey, Tetteh, Ankrah, Tetteyfio, Laryea, Ayitey, Okine, Bortey, Quarshie, Quaye, Quaynor, Ashong, Kotei, Clottey, Nai, Sowah, Odoi, Maale, Ako, Adjetey, Annang, Yemoh and Abbey.

== Geographic distribution ==
Gã is spoken in south-eastern Ghana, in and around the capital Accra. It has relatively little dialectal variation. Although English is the official language of Ghana, Gã is one of 16 languages in which the Bureau of Ghana Languages publishes material.

== Phonology ==
=== Consonants ===
Gã has 31 consonant phonemes.

Consonant phonemes
	Labial		Dental		Postalveolar and palatal				Velar				Labial- velar		Glottal	
	Labial		Dental		Plain		Labialized		Plain		Lab.v		Labial- velar		Plain	Lab.
Nasal	m		n		ɲ				ŋ				ŋ͡m			
Stop	p	b	t	d	tʃ	dʒ	tʃʷ	dʒʷ	k	ɡ	kʷ	ɡʷ	k͡p	ɡ͡b		
Fricative	f	v	s	z	ʃ		ʃʷ								h	hʷ
Approximant			l		j		ɥ						w			

- [ŋʷ] is an allophone of /w/ which occurs before nasals and is represented with its own digraph in writing.
- /l/ may be realised as [ɹ] when between a consonant and vowel.
- /j/ has an allophone [ɲ] before nasal vowels.

=== Vowels ===
Gã has seven oral vowels and five nasal vowels. All of the vowels have three different vowel lengths: short, long or extra long (the latter appears only in the simple future and the simple past negative forms).

Monophthongs
	Front		Central		Back	
	oral	nasal	oral	nasal	oral	nasal
Close	i	ĩ			u	ũ
Close-mid	e				o	
Open-mid	ɛ	ɛ̃			ɔ	ɔ̃
Open			a	ã		

=== Tones ===
Ga has two tones, high and low. Like many West African languages, it has tone terracing.

=== Phonotactics ===
The syllable structure of Ga is (C)(C)V(C), where the second phoneme of an initial consonant cluster can only be /l/ and a final consonant may only be a (short or long) nasal consonant, e.g. ekome, "one", V-CV-CV; kakadaŋŋ, "long", CV-CV-CVC; mli, "inside", CCV. Ga syllables may also consist solely of a syllabic nasal, for example in the first syllable of ŋshɔ, "sea".

== Writing system ==
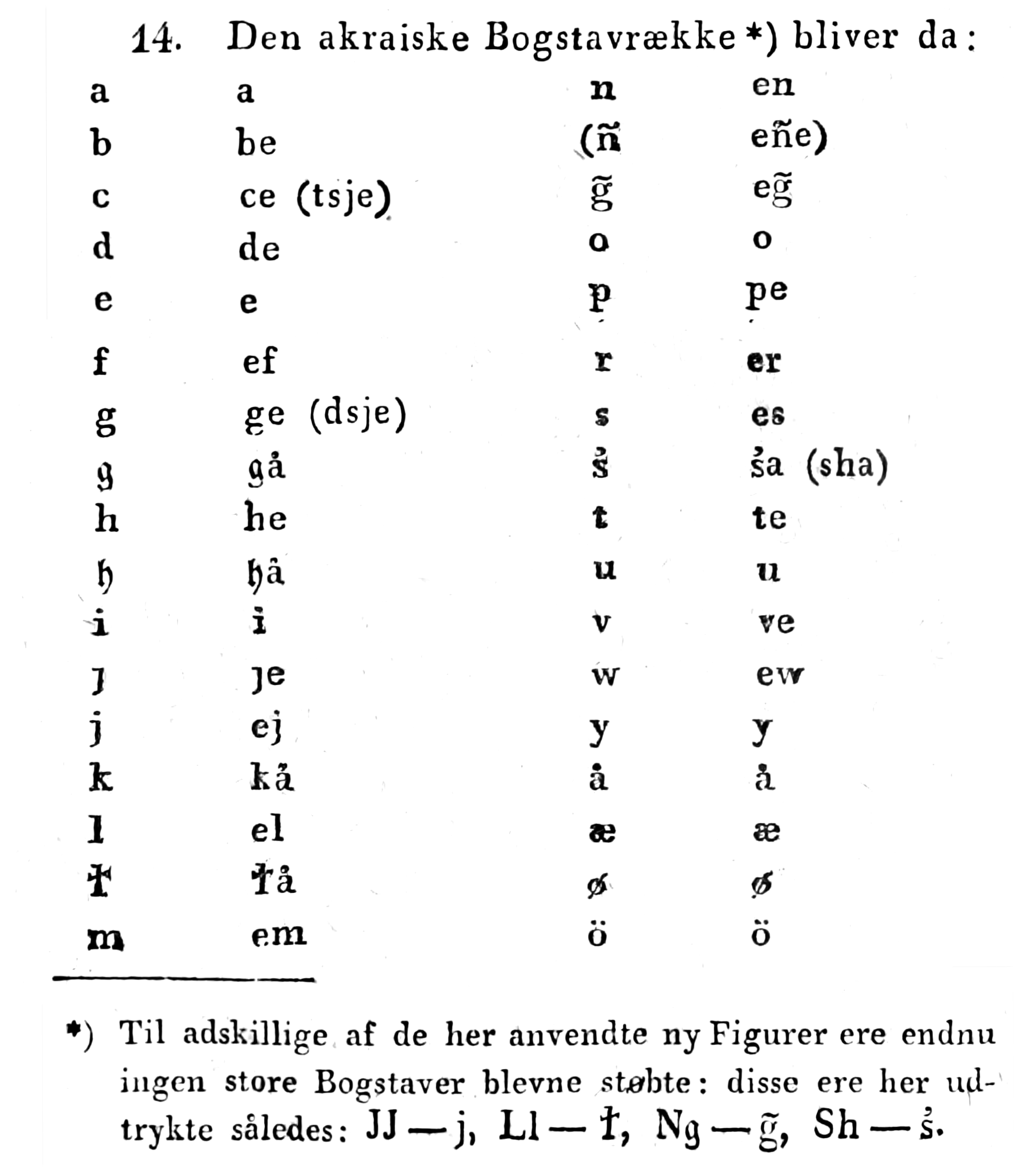
Ga alphabet of 1828

Ga was first written in about 1764, by Christian Jacob Protten (1715–1769), who was the son of a Danish soldier and a Ga woman. Protten was a Gold Coast Euro-African Moravian missionary and educator in the eighteenth century. In the mid-1800s, the Germany missionary Johannes Zimmermann (1825–1876), assisted by the Gold Coast historian Carl Christian Reindorf (1834–1917) and others, worked extensively on the grammar of the language, published a dictionary and translated the entire Bible into the Ga language. The orthography has been revised a number of times since 1968, with the most recent review in 1990.

The writing system is a Latin-based alphabet and has 26 letters. It has three additional letter symbols which correspond to the IPA symbols. There are also eleven digraphs and two trigraphs. Vowel length is represented by doubling or tripling the vowel symbol, e.g. 'a', 'aa' and 'aaa'. Tones are not represented. Nasalisation is represented after oral consonants where it distinguishes between minimal pairs.

The Ga alphabet is:

Aa, Bb, Dd, Ee, Ɛɛ, Ff, Gg, Hh, Ii, Jj, Kk, Ll, Mm, Nn, Ŋŋ, Oo, Ɔɔ, Pp, Rr, Ss, Tt, Uu, Vv, Ww, Yy, Zz

The following letters represent sounds which do not correspond with the same letter as the IPA symbol (e.g. B represents /b/):

- J j - /d͡ʒ/
- Y y - /j/

Digraphs and trigraphs:

- Gb gb - /ɡ͡b/
- Gw gw - /ɡʷ/
- Hw hw - /hʷ/
- Jw jw - /d͡ʒʷ/
- Kp kp - /k͡p/
- Kw kw - /kʷ/
- Ny ny - /ɲ/
- Ŋm ŋm - /ŋ͡m/
- Ŋw ŋw - [ŋʷ] (an allophone rather than a phoneme)
- Sh sh - /ʃ/
- Ts ts - /t͡ʃ/
- Shw shw - /ʃʷ/
- Tsw tsw - /t͡ʃʷ/

== Oral literature ==
In his 1865 collection, Wit and Wisdom from West Africa, Richard Francis Burton published over 200 Ga proverbs and sayings with English translations, taken from Johannes Zimmermann's Grammatical Sketch of the Akra Language. Here are some of those sayings as recorded with its historical orthography: (Note: In the modern orthography, these would be written as: Tutsɔfa kɛ la yeee.; Kɛji na lɛ, gbɔmɛi fɛɛ diɔ.; Nu ni akɛbaagbe la lɛ, ataooo lɛ krɔŋkrɔŋ.; Akɛ hiŋmɛii enyɔ kwɛɛɛ tɔ mli.)

- "Tutsofa ke la yee." "Gunpowder and fire do not agree." (#7)
- "Ke dse na le, gbomei fe dio." "If it is dark, all men are black." (#11)
- "Nu ni ake-bagbe la le, ataoole kronkron." "Clear water is not wanted for quenching fire." (#13)
- "Ake hinmeii enyo kwee to mli." "Not with both eyes people look into a bottle." (#15)

== See also ==
- Ga people
- Languages of Ghana
- Christian Jacob Protten
- Carl Christian Reindorf
- Johannes Zimmermann
