= Pointe Coupée Slave Conspiracy of 1795 =

Slave revolt in Spanish Louisiana

The Pointe Coupée Slave Conspiracy of 1795 was an attempted slave rebellion which took place in Spanish Louisiana in 1795. It has attracted a lot of attention and been the subject of much historical research. It was preceded by the Pointe Coupée Slave Conspiracy of 1791.

== Trial ==
On May 4, 1795, 57 enslaved people and three collaborating local white men were put on trial in modern day Pointe Coupée Parish after an attempted slave conspiracy in the vicinity of the Pointe Coupée military post. Planters found a copy of Victor de Mirabeau (Mirabeau the Elder)'s Théorie de l'Impôt, which included the Declaration of the Rights of Man and of the Citizen of 1789, in one cabin. The trial ended with 23 of the enslaved people being hanged, their corpses decapitated, and their heads posted along the road. 31 more were sentenced to flogging and hard labor. All three white men were deported with two sentenced to six years forced labor in Havana.

== See also ==
- History of slavery in Louisiana
- Pointe Coupée Conspiracy
