= Robin Law =

British Africanist (born 1944)

- Born: Robin C. C. Law; 1944 (age 81–82)
- Education: University of Oxford; University of Birmingham
- Occupation: Africanist

Robin C. C. Law (born 1944) is a British Africanist and since 2009 Emeritus Professor of the History of Africa at the University of Stirling.

He obtained a BA degree in Literae Humaniores at the University of Oxford in 1967 and a PhD in History at the University of Birmingham in 1972. As a researcher, he worked at the University of Lagos, Nigeria (1966–1969), and at the Centre of West African Studies of the University of Birmingham (1970–1972). He joined the University of Stirling in 1972, and was subsequently Lecturer, Senior Lecturer, and Reader, becoming Professor of African History in 1993. He was a Visiting Fellow at the African Studies Centre Leiden (1993–1994), and a visiting professor at York University, Canada (1996–1997) and the Hebrew University of Jerusalem (2000–2001).

On 3 April 2009, at the University of Texas at Austin, Law was presented with a book produced in his honour, with chapters placing his scholarship in its historiographical context. Titled The Changing Worlds of Atlantic Africa: Essays in Honor of Robin Law, the volume was edited by Toyin Falola and Matt D. Childs.

Law received the Distinguished Africanist award of the African Studies Association of the UK (ASAUK) for 2010.

== Publications ==
Law published many scholarly books and research articles on Africa, including:

- The Oyo Empire, c. 1600–c. 1836: A West African Imperialism in the Era of the Atlantic Slave Trade. Oxford: Clarendon Press, 1977. Oxford Studies in African Affairs.
- The horse in West African history: the role of the horse in the societies of pre-colonial West Africa, Oxford: Oxford University Press for the International Africa Institute, 1980. New edition London: Routledge, 2020.
- The slave coast of West Africa, 1550–1750: the impact of the Atlantic slave trade on an African society, Oxford: Clarendon Press; New York: Oxford University Press, 1991, 2002.
- The English in West Africa, 1685–1688: the local correspondence of the Royal African Company of England, 1681-1699, by Law, Robin, Ed., Oxford: Published for the British Academy by Oxford University Press, Part 1 and 2 (1681–1688); Part 1: 1997, Part 2: 2001, Part 3 (1691–1699): 2007. Fontes historiae Africanae, new series 5.
- Ouidah: The Social History of a West African Slaving Port 1727–1892, Athens: Ohio, Ohio University Press, 2004. Suffolk: Boydell & Brewer, 2017.
- Dahomey and the ending of the trans-Atlantic slave trade: the journals and correspondence of Vice-Consul Louis Fraser, 1851-1852. Oxford: Published for the British Academy by Oxford University Press, 2012. Series: Fontes historiae Africanae, new series 10.
- "Benin", in Encyclopedia Britannica.
