= Slave Coast of West Africa =

Historical name of a region in West Africa

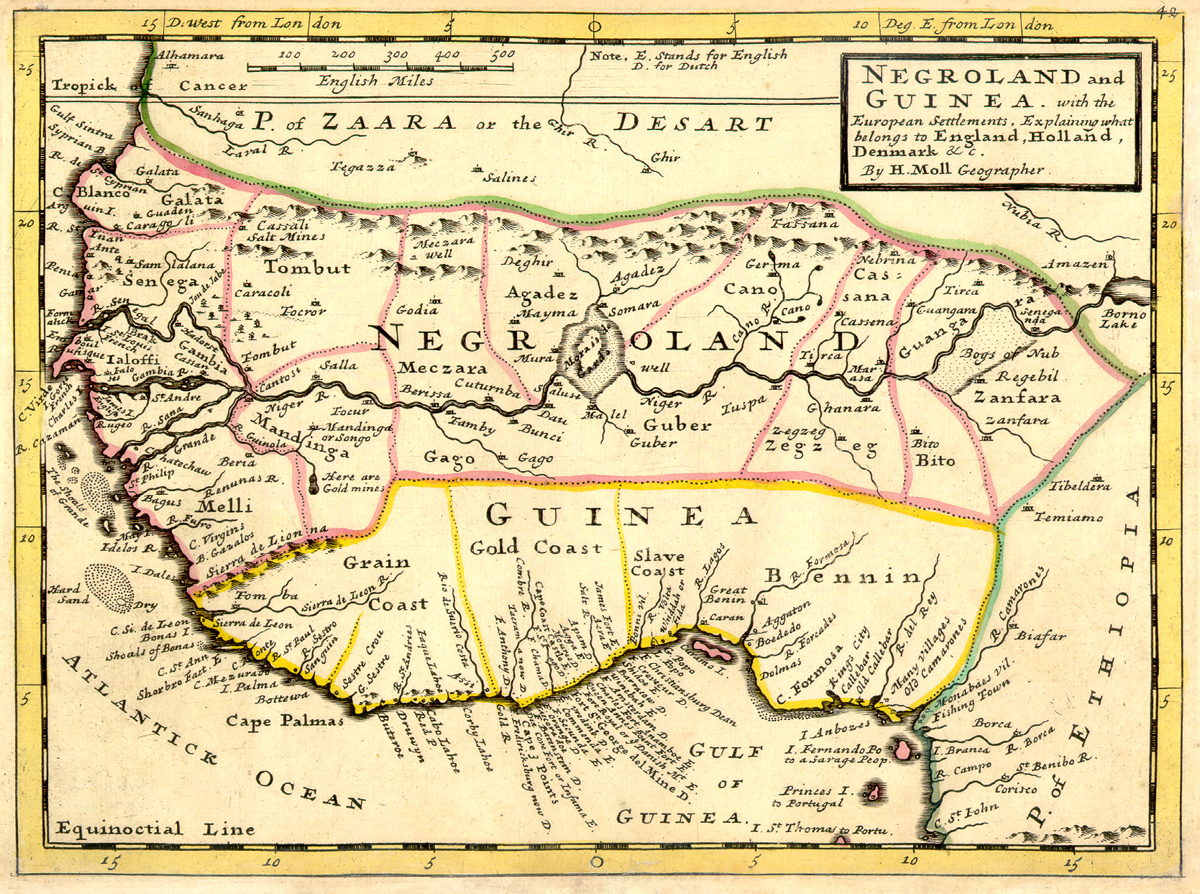
A 1729 map showing the Slave Coast

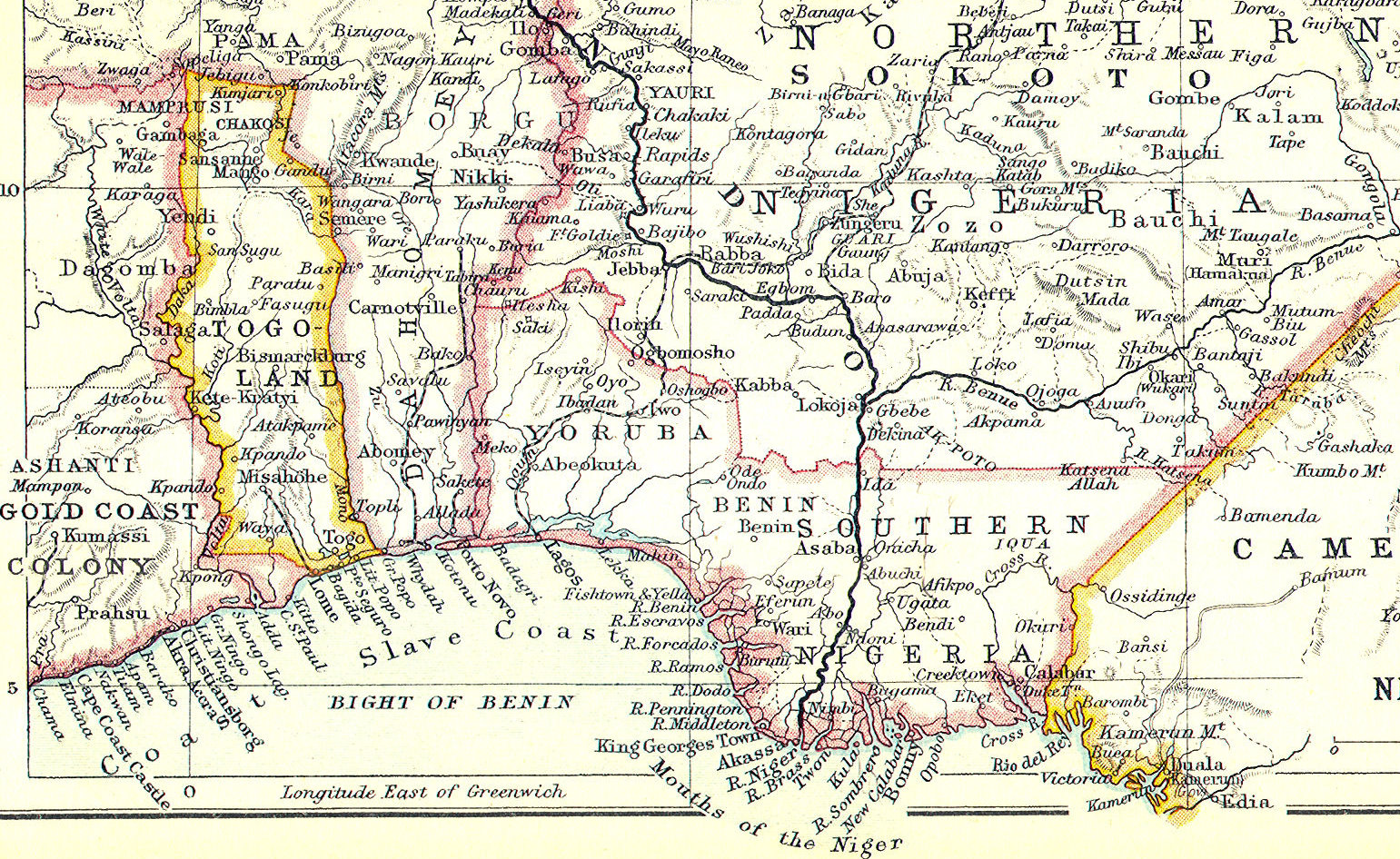
The Slave Coast is still marked on this c. 1914 map by John Bartholomew & Co. of Edinburgh.

Major slave trading areas of western Africa, 15th–19th centuries

The Slave Coast is a historical region along the Atlantic coast of West Africa, encompassing parts of modern-day Togo, Benin, and Nigeria. It is located along the Bight of Biafra and the Bight of Benin that is located between the Volta River and the Lagos Lagoon.

The name arose in the seventeenth century to differentiate it from the predominant trades in adjoining regions. For instance, the neighbouring Gold Coast (southern Ghana) was an important source of gold for European merchants, with any outward trade in slaves discouraged so as not to affect the main product of that area. (Note: The Gold Coast did eventually become a large exporter of slaves, with the value of slaves exceeding that of gold at the end of the seventeenth century. Before then, the Gold Coast was an importer of slaves.) The Slave Coast was a major source of African people sold into slavery during the Atlantic slave trade from the early 16th century to the late 19th century. During this time, this coastal area became a major hub for the export of enslaved Africans to the Americas. European powers, including the Portuguese, British, Dutch, Danish, and French, established forts and trading posts in the region to facilitate the slave trade. The area was so named due to the high volume of enslaved people transported from its shores, profoundly affecting both the local societies and the broader Atlantic world.

The Slave Coast is estimated to have been the point of departure for approximately two million enslaved Africans, representing about 16% of the estimated 12.5 million individuals transported to the Americas during the transatlantic slave trade. This equates to an average of around 20 individuals leaving the Slave Coast each day for over two centuries. A significant number of these individuals, likely more than half, were embarked from the beach south of Ouidah, which lacked formal port facilities. The other primary port from which slaves embarked was Lagos. These figures represent only those who survived the conditions prior to departure, including the harsh waiting and loading periods.

Other nearby coastal regions were historically known by their prime colonial export are the Gold Coast, the Ivory Coast (or Windward Coast), and the Pepper Coast (or Grain Coast).

== Historical background ==
=== European contact and initial trade ===
European sources began documenting the development of trade in the "Slave Coast" region and its integration into the transatlantic slave trade around 1670.

In the 18th century, intermarriage between European residents and African women was primarily linked to the European forts established in Ouidah. While most European personnel either died or returned home after short tenures, those who stayed longer often formed relationships with local women and had children.

=== Transatlantic slave trade ===
The transatlantic slave trade led to the formation of an "Atlantic community" of Africans and Europeans in the 17th, 18th, and 19th century. Roughly twelve million enslaved Africans were purchased by European slave traders from African slave merchants during the period of the transatlantic slave trade. Enslaved Africans were transported to the Americas to work on cash crop plantations in European colonies. Ports that exported these enslaved people from Africa include Ouidah, Lagos, Aného (Little Popo), Grand-Popo, Agoué, Jakin, Porto-Novo, and Badagry. These ports traded slaves who were supplied from African communities, tribes and kingdoms, including the Allada and Ouidah, which were later taken over by the Dahomey kingdom.

The extensive slave trade along the Slave Coast contributed to the development of a diverse population engaged in transatlantic commercial and social networks. This population played an influential role in shaping both Atlantic commerce and culture.

=== Abolition ===
The transatlantic slave trade in West Africa began to decline earlier than in other regions. While the flow of captives from Atlantic Africa is generally considered to have first been restricted by legislation and diplomatic and naval pressure over several decades in the early 19th century, the decline in West Africa started even before abolition laws were enacted. Most powerful slave-trading countries had begun abolitionist campaigns in 1807, while the volume of slave shipments began to decline in West Africa from 1787. This was due to colonial legislation creating favorable circumstances for abolition and greater economic opportunities, such as the cash crop revolution, empowering former slaves. This process influenced the enforcing of abolition through legislation in the remaining countries which were involved in the trade.

== Human toll ==
The coast was also called "the White man's grave" because of the mass amount of death from illnesses such as yellow fever, malaria, heat exhaustion, and many gastro-entero sicknesses. In 1841, 80% of British sailors serving in military expeditions on the Niger River were infected with fevers. Between 1844 and 1854, 20 of the 74 French missionaries in Senegal died from local illnesses, and 19 more died shortly after arriving back to France. Intermarriage has been documented in ports like Ouidah where Europeans were permanently stationed. Communication was quite extensive among all three areas of trade, to the point where even individual enslaved people could be tracked.

The trans-Atlantic slave trade resulted in a vast and unknown loss of life for African captives both in and outside the Americas. Over a million people are thought to have died during their transport to the New World.

Modern historians estimate that between two and three million people were transported out of this region and traded for goods like alcohol and tobacco from the Americas and textiles from Europe as part of the triangular trade. Historians have noted that though official records state that twelve million enslaved Africans were transported to the Americas from Africa, the actual number of slaves purchased by European slave traders was considerably higher. Alongside other forms of trade, this complex exchange also fostered cultural exchanges between these three regions, involving religions, architectural styles, languages, and knowledge. In addition to the enslaved people, free men used the exchange routes to travel to new destinations, and both slaves and free travelers helped blend European and African cultures. After the institution of slavery was abolished by successive European governments, the transatlantic slave trade continued for a time, with independent traders operating in violation of their countries' laws.

The savage nature of the trade led to the destruction of individuals and cultures. Historian Ana Lucia Araujo has noted that the process of enslavement did not end with arrival on Western Hemisphere shores; the different paths taken by the individuals and groups who were victims of the trans-Atlantic slave trade were influenced by different factors—including the disembarking region, the ability to be sold on the market, the kind of work performed, gender, age, religion, and language.

University of Pittsburgh Professor of World History, Patrick Manning, estimates that about 12 million enslaved people were victims of the Atlantic trade between the 16th and 19th century, but that about 1.5 million people died on board ships. About 10.5 million slaves arrived in the Americas. Besides the enslaved people who died on the Middle Passage, more African people likely died during the slave raids in Africa and forced marches to ports. Manning estimates that 4 million people died inside Africa after capture, and many more died young. Manning's estimate covers the 12 million people who were originally destined for the Atlantic, as well as the 6 million people destined for Asian slave markets and the 8 million people destined for African markets. Of the slaves shipped to the Americas, the largest share went to Brazil and the Caribbean.

== See also ==
- Bristol slave trade
- Dutch Slave Coast

== Bibliography ==
- Commercial Agriculture, the Slave Trade and Slavery in Atlantic Africa. Boydell & Brewer. 2013. doi:10.7722/j.ctt31nj49.19. ISBN 978-1-84701-075-9
- Fuglestad, Finn (2018). "Introduction". Slave Traders by Invitation. Oxford University Press, pp. 1–18. doi:10.1093/oso/9780190876104.003.0001 ISBN 978-0-19-087610-4
- Law, Robin, "Slave-Raiders and Middlemen, Monopolists and Free-Traders: The Supply of Slaves for the Atlantic Trade in Dahomey c. 1750-1850", The Journal of African History, Vol.30, No. 1, 1989.
- Law, Robin. The Slave Coast of West Africa 1550–1750: The Impact of the Atlantic Slave Trade on an African Society. Clarendon Press, Oxford, 1991.
- Law, Robin; Mann, Kristin (1999). "West Africa in the Atlantic Community: The Case of the Slave Coast". The William and Mary Quarterly. 56 (2): 307–334. doi:10.2307/267412. ISSN 0043-5597
