= Baga =

Baga may refer to:

== People ==
- Baga (king) (3rd century BC), a king of ancient Mauretania
- Ena Baga (1906–2004), English pianist
- Kiri Baga (born 1995), American figure skater
- Rita Baga, Canadian drag queen
- Baga Chipz, stage name of Leo Loren, British drag queen

== Places ==
- Baga, Bhola, Bangladesh
- Baga, Patuakhali, Bangladesh
- Baga, Borno, Nigeria
- Baga, Goa, India
  - Baga Creek, a tidal estuary in Baga
- Bagà, Catalonia, Spain
- Baga, Mainling County, Tibet
- Baga, Doufelgou, Togo
- Baga, Togo
- Parga Township, Tibet, whose transcription from Chinese is Baga
- Mount Baga, Australia
- Another name for Mbava in Solomon Islands

== Other uses ==
- Baga (grape), a Portuguese wine grape variety
- Baga (novel), by Robert Pinget
- Baga Beach (film), 2013 Konkani-English film
- Bagå Formation, on the island of Bornholm, Denmark
- Baga people, of Guinea
  - Baga language
- British Amateur Gymnastics Association
- A synonym for the Portuguese wine grape Alicante Bouschet

== See also ==
- Baga de Secretis, a former English store of secret documents
- Bagas (disambiguation)
- Bagga
- Bhaga, an Indo-Iranian word for lord or patron
