= List of national capital city name etymologies =

This list covers English language names for national capital cities with their etymologies. Some of these include notes on indigenous names and their etymologies. Some of these etymologies are uncertain. The former capitals also have their etymologies listed in this article.

== A ==
Afghanistan:

Kabul (1774–present): Many scholars have argued that the city's name comes from the Kamboja tribe. It is also known in classical writings as Kophes or Kophene. The name could also be derived from Sanskrit कुब्ज "kubja" meaning "hump-backed" or "crooked."

Kandahar (1747–1774): There are many theories about the origin of the name Kandahar:
- From the Pashto Iskanderiya (Alexandria).
- From the name of the historical city of Gandahar.
- From the word قند, kand or qand in the local languages (Persian and Pashto), meaning "sweet" and هر, har may be short for شهر, shahar (city or town). The ancient word Gandh, derived from Gandhar also means a sweet, nice smell. The city is a source of fine grapes, pomegranates, apricots, melons and other sweet fruits.
- From two PIE words: kand (wall) and har (mountain, or stone), i.e., a city constructed of stone, or a stone-walled fortress. These words remain in use by the nomadic Indo-Pakistani Bagga and Sansi tribes.

Albania:

Tirana: There are several hypotheses for the origins of Tirana's name: Tirana is thought to come from the word Theranda, mentioned in ancient Greek and Latin sources, which locals called The Rana, since the field was formed as a result of solid materials that brought water from the surrounding mountains. Or, Tirana comes from Tirkan. Tirkan was a fortress on the mountain slope of Dajti. The ruins of this ancient castle still exist, dating back to the beginning of the first century before the birth of Christ, which is thought to have had a tower that Byzantium historian Prokop (shek. VI) called the tower of Tirkanit. Or, Tirana comes from old Greek Tyros (Τύρος) which means dairy. In the area of Tirana, dairy products made by shepherds from surrounding areas are traded. Or, Tirona, or Tirana as it is called in the dialect of the country, has its origins in what the people of this country are called. Given that the population located in this area comes mainly from the mountains of the area around it, locals call them "Te Ronet" (the fallen). Even today, in everyday language, families who come from mountainous areas use the expression "have fallen (e.g.) in Durres" (or elsewhere). (J. N. Priska) The name of Tirana was mentioned for the first time in 1418 in a Venetian document.
Durrës (1914–1920): via Latin Dyrrachium and Greek Δυρράχιον Dyrrachion meaning "bad spine" or "difficult ridge." The city's former name is Epidamnos Επίδαμνος meaning "The Damned" and is a cognate with Latin damnum meaning "loss" or "harm."
Shkodër (1042–1385): The origins of the city's name remain shrouded in mystery. The name on coins minted in Hellenistic Scodra (during the rule of Genthius) have the legend (Greek: ΣΚΟΝΔΡΙΝΩΝ). Somebelieve the name has a Latin root, while others that the name was Illyrian. In the early 20th century, Shkodër was referred to in English by the Italian name Scutari. In Greek, it is known as Σκουτάριον (Scutarion) or Σκόδρα (Skodra), in Serbian, Croatian Montenegrin, and Macedonian as Скадар (Skadar), and in Turkish as İşkodra. Some scholars believe that the name derives from "Shko-drin" which in Albanian means "where Drin goes", Drin being the Drin River that connects with the Buna River next to the castle of Rozafa.
Krujë The name of the city is related to the Albanian word kroi, krua, meaning "fountain", from Proto-Albanian *krana < *krasna. The city was attested for the first time as Kroai (in medieval Greek Κροαί) in Byzantine documents of the early 7th century. In medieval Latin it was known as Croia, Croya and Croarum. During the Ottoman era it was also known as Ak Hisar or Akçahisar from the Turkish words ak (white) and hisar (castle).

Algeria:

Algiers: Derived from the Arabic word الجزائر (al-ǧazāʼir), which translates as the islands, referring to the four islands which lay off that city's coast until becoming part of the mainland in 1525; al-ǧazāʼir is itself short for the older name جزائر بني مازغان ǧazāʼir banī mazġannā, "the islands of (the tribe) Bani Mazghanna", used by early medieval geographers such as al-Idrisi and Yaqut al-Hamawi.

Andorra

Andorra La Vella: "Andorra the Old" in Catalan.

Angola:

Luanda/Loanda: The place name comes from the root word Luanda lu-ndandu. The prefix lu, originally a plural form of the Bantu languages, is common in the names of parts of the coast of river basins or wetlands (examples: Luena, Lucala Lobito) and in this case, refers to the sandbank surrounded by the sea. Ndandu means value or traded and alludes to the exploitation of small shells collected the island of Luanda and which constituted the currency in the ancient Kingdom of Congo and much of the West African coast, known as zimbo or njimbo. As the Mbundu people shaped the pronunciation of place names in various regions of their manner of speaking, eliminating some sounds when they did not alter the meaning of the word, Lu-ndandu became Lu-andu. The word in Portuguese became feminine, since it referred to an island, and resulted in Luanda.
Huambo: Etymology unknown; formerly known as Nova Lisboa meaning "New Lisbon" in Portuguese.

Antigua and Barbuda:

Saint John's: "Belonging to Saint John."

Argentina:

Buenos Aires: "Fair Winds" in Spanish. The original settlement was called Ciudad de la Santísima Trinidad y Puerto de Nuestra Señora la Virgen María de los Buenos Aires ("City of the Most Holy Trinity and Port of Saint Mary of the Fair Winds"), after the site of the Santa Maria di Bonaria (Saint Mary of the Fair Winds) in Cagliari (Sardinia, Italy). The short form "Buenos Aires" became the common usage during the 17th century.
Paraná (confederate capital from 1852 to 1862): from the Guarani paraná, "wide river"; the words for "river", "large river", "lagoon", "sea" and "lake" have different meanings in Tupi, leading to confusion that Paraná meant sea.

Armenia:

Yerevan: Early Christian Armenian chroniclers attributed Yerevan's origin to having been derived from an expression exclaimed by Noah, in Armenian, while looking in the direction of Yerevan, after the ark had landed on Mount Ararat and the floodwaters had receded: "Yerevats!" ("it appeared!"). Another theory on the origin of the name is that the city was named after the Armenian king, Yervand IV (the Last), the last leader of the Orontid dynasty and founder of the city of Yervandashat. However, it is likely that the city's name is derived from an Urartian military fortress called Erebuni (Էրեբունի), which was founded on the territory of modern-day Yerevan in 782 B.C. by Argishti I. As elements of the Urartian language blended with that of the Armenian one, it eventually evolved into Yerevan; scholar Margarit Israelyan notes these changes when comparing inscriptions found on two cuneiform tablets at Erebuni: The transcription of the second cuneiform bu [original emphasis] of the word was very essential in our interpretation as it is the Urartaean b that has been shifted to the Armenian v (b > v). The original writing of the inscription read «er-bu-ni»; leading Armenianologist–orientalist Prof. G. A. Ghapantsian to say that the Urartu b changed to v at the beginning of the word (Biani > Van) or between two vowels (ebani > avan, Zabaha > Javakhk)....In other words, b was placed between two vowels.

Australia:

Canberra: The word "Canberra" is derived from the word Kanbarra meaning "meeting place" in the old Ngunnawal language of the local Ngabri people. Alternatively, the name was reported to mean "woman's breasts", by journalist John Gale in the 1860s, referring to the mountains of Mount Ainslie and Black Mountain. The Ngunnawal name was apparently used as a reference to corroborees held during the seasonal migration of the Ngunnawal people to feast on the bogong moths that pass through the region each spring.
Melbourne (1901–1927): "Mill Stream" or "Mill Spring."

Austria:

Vienna (German: Wien): From Celtic Vindobona (vindo "white" + bona "foundation, fort")

Azerbaijan:

Baku: The name Baku is widely believed to be derived from the old Persian names of the city باد-که Bād-kube, meaning "Wind-pounded city", in which bād means "wind" and kube is rooted in the verb کوبی kubidan, "to pound", thus referring to a place where wind is strong and pounding. Indeed, the city is renowned for its fierce winter snow storms and harsh winds. It is also believed that Baku refers to Baghkuh, meaning "Mount of God". 𐎲𐎠𐎥𐎠 Baga and 𐎣𐎠𐎢𐎳𐎠 kaufa (now kuh) are the Old Persian words for "god" and "mountain" respectively; the name Baghkuh may be compared with Baghdād ("God-given") in which dād is the Old Persian word for "give". Arabic sources refer to the city as Baku, Bakukh, Bakuya, and Bakuye, all of which seem to come from a Persian name.
Various different hypotheses were also proposed to explain the etymology of the word Baku. According to L.G. Lopatinski and Ali Huseynzade Baku is derived from Turkic word for "hill". Caucasian history specialist K.P. Patkanov also explains the name as "hill" but in the Lak language. The Turkish Islamic Encyclopedia presents the origin of the word Baku as being derived from the words Bey-Kyoy, which mean "the main city" in Turkic. Also another theory suggests that the name Baku is derived from the ancient Caucasian Albanian city called Baguan.
Ganja (June–December 1918): Modern historians believe that the Persian name Ganja (گنجه / Ganjeh, "Ganja" derives from the New Persian ganj (گنج: "treasure, treasury")) suggests that the city existed in pre-Islamic times and was likely founded in the fifth century A.D. The area in which Ganja is located was known as Arran from the ninth to twelfth century; its urban population spoke mainly the Persian language.

== B ==
Bahamas:

Nassau: Named in honour of King William III who belonged to a branch of the House of Orange-Nassau. The city was known as Charles Town (Named after King Charles II of England) from the 1600s–1695.

Bahrain:

Manama: Etymology unknown and disputed.
Zubarah (1783–1870; now in Qatar): Etymology unknown.

Bangladesh:

Dhaka/Dacca (1608–1704, 1770–now): The name of the city may have derived after the establishment of the Goddess Dhakeshwari's temple by Ballal Sena in the 12th century.
Mujibnagar (April 11 – December 16, 1971): From Bengali মুজিবনগর meaning "Mujibur's City."
Murshidabad (1704–1770; now in India): From Bengali মুর্শিদাবাদ meaning "Murshid's Palace."
Akbarnagar (1595–1608): From Bengali আকবরনগর meaning "Akbar's City."

Barbados:

Bridgetown: The city was known as Indian Bridge from 1627 to 16?? and Saint Michael from 16?? to 1654.

Belarus:

Minsk: The Old East Slavic name of the town was Мѣньскъ (i.e. Měnsk < Early Proto-Slavic or Late Indo-European Mēnĭskŭ), derived from a river name Měn (< Mēnŭ, with the same etymology as German Main; from Latin Moenus or Menus). The direct continuation of this name in Belarusian is Miensk (pronounced [ˈmʲɛnsk]). In the 16th and 17th centuries, however, the pronunciation of this name in the Ruthenian language common to the ancestors of Belarusians, Rusyns and Ukrainians was influenced by the pronunciation of *ě as i in many Ukrainian dialects. The resulting form of the name, Minsk (spelled either Минскъ or Мѣнскъ) was taken over in both Russian (modern spelling: Минск) and Polish (Mińsk), and especially under the influence of Russian it also became official in Belarusian. However, some Belarusian-speakers continue to use Miensk (spelled Мeнск) as their preferred name for the city. Another explanation of the origins of the modern form of the name, Minsk, is the strong Ukrainian influence in the Belarusian lexicography in the 1920s, which resulted in the Ukrainian-like i vocalisation of then-deprecated ѣ.

Belgium:

Brussels: The most common theory for the etymology of Brussels is that it derives from the Old Dutch Broeksel or other spelling variants, which means marsh (broek) and home (sel) or "home in the marsh".

Belize:

Belmopan: A compound of two river names: the Belize and the Mopan.
Belize City (1798 – August 3, 1970): See Etymology of Belize for more information.
Saint George's Caye (?–1798)

Benin:

Porto-Novo: "New Port" in Portuguese.
Abomey (?–927): "Inside the Walls"
Cotonou (seat of government): The name 'Cotonou' means 'the mouth of the river of death' in the Fon language.

Bhutan:

Thimphu (1964–present; summer capital until 1949): Etymology unknown.
Punakha (1949–1964; winter capital until 1949): Etymology unknown

Bolivia:

La Paz (de facto administrative seat since 1898): "Peace" in Spanish. Officially Nuestra Señora de La Paz meaning "Our Lady of Peace."
Sucre: Named in honor of the revolutionary leader Antonio José de Sucre in 1839. The former name "La Plata" means "The Silvery One." The official name Ciudad de la Plata de la Nueva Toledo literally means "City of the Silver of New Toledo."
Chuquisaca (1538–1839): Etymology unknown or disputed. Probably of Quechua or Aymara origin.
Tacna (Capital of Peru–Bolivia from 1836 to 1839; now in Peru): See Tacna below.

Bosnia and Herzegovina:

Sarajevo: The name Sarajevo is derived from Turkish saray ovası, meaning the field around saray (palace).
Banja Luka (c. 1553–1638): "Ban's Meadows" in Bosnian, but can also mean "Bath Port" or "Spa Port". Ban is a medieval dignitary and can mean "lord", "ruler", or "master".

Botswana:

Gaborone (Gaberones): Named for Chief Gaborone of the Tlokwa. Known as Gaberones until 1969.
Mafeking (1885–1965): Derived from Tswana "Mafikeng" meaning "Stone Location".

Brazil:

Brasília: From the Latin name of the country Brasilia.
Rio de Janeiro (1763–1960): "River of January"; the city harbor was discovered on January 1, 1502, and was believed to be the mouth of a river (such as the Tagus estuary which forms a bay by Lisbon).
Salvador, Bahia (1549–1763): The present city was established as the fortress of São Salvador da Bahia de Todos os Santos ("Holy Savior of the Bay of All Saints") after Jesus Christ, the savior of humanity for christians.

Brunei:

Bandar Seri Begawan: Seri Begawan was named after the Sultan's late father Sir Omar Ali Saifuddien on 5 October 1970, its original name being Bandar Brunei. Begawan is a name given to Bruneian monarchs who have abdicated, originally coming from the Sanskrit word for "god": भगवान bhagavān. Seri also comes from the honorific Sanskrit word Sri. Bandar comes from Persian بندر via Indian languages and means "port" or "haven" (bandar means "town" in Malay). The city was known as Brunei Town until October 4, 1972.

Bulgaria:

Sofia: From Ancient Greek Σόφια, meaning "Wisdom."
Veliko Tarnovo (1185–1393 and 1877–1879): Derived from the Slavic roots velik ("great") and tarn ("thorn") or from Latin turis ("tower") or tres naves ("three ships", referring to the three hills) + the Slavic suffix -ovo.
Nikopol (1393–1395): Derived from Greek Nikopolis (Νικόπολις), "City of Victory". Nikopolis is a combination of two Greek words: Νίκη "Victory"+Πόλις "City."

Burkina Faso:

Ouagadougou: The name Ouagadougou goes back to the 15th century when the Yonyonse and the Ninsi tribes inhabited the area. They were in constant conflict until 1441 when Wubri, a Yonyonse hero and an important figure in the region's history, led his tribe to victory. He then renamed the area from "Kumbee-Tenga", as the Ninsi had called it, to "Wogodogo", meaning "where people get honor and respect;" The spelling Ouagadougou, a corruption of Wogodogo, is due to French influence as the region was formerly ruled by France. If the local version of English orthography was used (as in Ghana or Nigeria), the spelling would be 'Wagadugu'.

Burundi:

Gitega (2018–present): Etymology unknown.
Bujumbura (1962–2018): Etymology unknown. Possibly involving the word for "market", or possibly derived from Kirundi word "jūmbu" meaning "sweet potato" (iki-jūmbu) or "copper" (umu-jūmbu). Known as Usumbura from c. 1680 to 1962.

== C ==
Cambodia:

Phnom Penh (1434–1505 and 1865–present): "Penh's Hill" in Khmer. Phnom Penh city takes its name from the Wat Phnom, meaning 'Hill Temple'. Legend has it that in 1372, an old nun named Penh went to fetch water in the Mekong river and found a dead Koki tree floating down the stream. In a hole in the dead tree were four bronze and one stone Buddha statues.
Oudong (1505–1515 and 1618–1865): Named after King Uthong. The city's name is derived from the Sanskrit word: उत्तुङ्ग uttuṅga, meaning "supreme."
Lovek (1528–1566 and 1576–1594): Derived from Khmer ល្អូវអែ.្ក, meaning "intersection" or "crossroads."
Pursat (16th century–1528): Derived from a type of tree. Another theory is that the name "Pursat" is derived from Bodhisattva.
Tuol Basan (1431–1434): Etymology unknown.
Angkor (802–1431 and 1566–1576): The word Angkor is derived from Sanskrit. Angkor is a vernacular form of the word នគរ nokor which comes from the Sanskrit word नगर 'nagara' meaning capital or city.

Cameroon:

Yaoundé (1922–1940 and 1946–present): The name of Yaoundé is a corruption of the name of the Ewondo, originally ethnic groups residing here. Ewondo-speakers call Yaoundé "Ongola".
Douala (1916–1922 and 1940–1946): Named after the native Duala people.

Canada:

Ottawa: Named after the Odawa people whose name probably means "traders." Derived from "aadwe" meaning "to trade" or "to buy and sell."
Kingston (1841–1843): 'Ton' is a Middle English variant of 'town'. The town was named for King George III.
Montreal (1843–1849): Derived from Mont Réal meaning "royal mount" in Middle French. (Mont Royal in Modern French)
Toronto (1849–1859): Derived from Iroquois word "tkaronto" meaning "place where trees stand in the water."
Quebec City (1859–1867): Derived from the Algonquin word kébec meaning "where the river narrows."

Cape Verde:

Praia: "Beach" in Portuguese and Cape Verdean creole. The city was known as Vila de Praia ("village of the beach") from 1769 to 1974.
Cidade de Ribeira (1462–1769): "City of Riverside" in Portuguese. The current name is Cidade Velha meaning "Old City." The official name for the city was Ribeira Grande meaning "Large River" in Portuguese.

Central African Republic:

Bangui: Named after the Ubangi River.
Abiras (1894–1906): Etymology unknown.
Fort de Possel (February 11 – December 11, 1906): Named in honor of René de Possel, a French commander killed in action in 1899.
Fort Crampel (1900–1940): Named after Paul Crampel.

Chad:

N'Djamena: Taken from the Arab name of a nearby village, نجامينا Niǧāmīnā, meaning "place of rest." Known as Fort Lamy (named after Amédée-François Lamy) from 1900 to September 6, 1973.

Chile:

Santiago de Chile: "St. James of Chile"
Valparaíso (legislative capital since 1987): Derived from Spanish Valle Paraíso meaning "Paradise Valley."

China:

Beijing: From the pinyin (Mandarin) spelling of Chinese: 北京; pinyin: Běijīng, meaning "Northern Capital".
Chungking (1939–1946): The Wade-Giles transliteration of simplified Chinese: 重庆; traditional Chinese: 重慶; pinyin: Chóngqìng, meaning "Double Celebration."
Hankou (1937–1938): From the pinyin (Mandarin) spelling of simplified Chinese: 汉口; traditional Chinese: 漢口; pinyin: Hànkǒu, meaning "Han mouth." The Wade–Giles spelling is Hankow.
Nanking (1928–1937): The Wade-Giles transliteration of Chinese: 南京; pinyin: Nánjīng, meaning "southern capital."

Colombia:

Bogotá: Bogotá was originally called "Bacatá" (which means "enclosure outside the farm fields") by the Muisca.

Comoros:

Moroni: "Heart of Fire" in Comorian.
Dzaoudzi (1887–1962)
Chingoni (1841–1887): Named after the Ngoni/Nguni people.

Republic of the Congo:

Brazzaville: Named after Pierre Savorgnan de Brazza. The town's former name is Nkuna.

Democratic Republic of the Congo:

Kinshasa: Named for a village named Kinchassa that once stood near the site. The city's former name is Léopoldville, in honor of King Leopold of Belgium. The city had that name from 1923 to 1966.
Boma (1886–1923): "Fort" in Kongo.

Costa Rica:

San José: "St. Joseph" in Spanish.

Côte d'Ivoire:

Yamoussoukro: Named after Queen Yamousso.
Abidjan (1934 – March 21, 1983; current administrative capital): Supposedly, when the first colonists asked native women the name of the place, the women misunderstood and replied "T'chan m'bi djan": "I've just been cutting leaves".
Bingerville (1900–1934): Named after Louis-Gustave Binger.
Assinie (1889–1893)
Grand-Bassam (1843–1889 and 1893–1900): there are several theories as to the origin of Bassam. According to Professor Niangoran Bouah, ethno-sociologist, Bassam was not a village, which the very first capital of the Ivory Coast has given its name. He has two hypotheses for the origin of the word Bassam. On the one hand, it could descend from the N'Zima word Bazouam, which is a cry for help. One woman called out N'Zima to a European, and this was mistaken for the name of the place. The second thesis stems from the language of Abour, from the word alsam (Abour for: dusk) developed by linguistic convenience to Abassam and later Bassam. Niangoran Bouah tends to attach more weight to the second thesis.

Croatia:

Zagreb: The name Zagreb appears to have been recorded in 1094, although its origins are less clear. The Croatian verb "zagrabiti" roughly translates as "scoop", which forms the basis of some legends. One Croat legend says that a Croat ban (viceroy) was leading his thirsty soldiers across a deserted region. He drove his sabre into the ground in frustration and water poured out, so he ordered his soldiers to dig for water. The idea of digging or unearthing is supported by scientists who suggest that the settlement was established beyond a water-filled hole or graba and that the name derives from this. Some suggest that the name derives from the term 'za breg', meaning beyond the hill. The hill may well have been the riverbank of the River Sava, which is believed to have previously flowed closer to the city centre. From here, the words may have been fused, leading to the name Zagreb. According to another legend, a city ruler was thirsty and ordered a girl named Manda to take water from Lake Manduševac (nowadays a fountain), using the sentence: "Zagrabi, Mando!" which means," Scoop it, Manda!" A less probable theory is that the name is related to the Zagros mountains of Iran. The name probably comes from "zagrabiti" (Eng. draw (water). Conscience) According to sources, Zagreb means "behind the mountains" (Croat. "za grebom)". Agram is the historic German name of the city, which was its official name from 1557 to 1918.
Varaždin (1767–1776): Derived from the fortress called Garestin, built some time before the 12th century.
Knin (925–10??): Etymology unknown and disputed.
Nin (625–925): The German name is Fleissenberg meaning "Castle of Diligence".

Cuba:

Havana: Of obscure origin, possibly derived from Habaguanex, a native American chief who controlled that area, as mentioned by Diego Velázquez in his report to the king of Spain.
Baracoa (1511–1514)
Santiago de Cuba (1514–1589): St. James of Cuba.

Cyprus:

Nicosia: Mispronunciation of the city's Greek name Λευκωσία Lefkosia (Turkish form 'Lefkoşa'), which means "White City".

Czech Republic:

Prague: The name Prague comes from an old Slavic root, praga, which means "ford", referring to the city's origin at a crossing of the Vltava River. The native name of the city, Praha, is also related to the modern Czech word práh ("threshold"). A legendary etymology connects the name of the city with duchess Libuše, a prophetess and a wife of the mythical founder of the Přemyslid dynasty. She is said to have ordered, "the city to be built where a man hews a threshold of his house". Czech práh should be understood here as to be in the river, rapids or cataract: its edge as a passage to the other riverside. Contrarily, although there are a few weirs nowadays, no such geological threshold was discovered in the river under the Prague Castle. Thus some derive the name Praha from the stone of the hill, where the original castle was built: na prazě, the original term for shale rock. (In those days, there were forests around the castle, on the nine hills of the future city: the Old Town on the other riverbank as well as the Lesser Town underneath the castle appeared later.)

== D ==
Denmark:

Copenhagen: Derived from the city's Danish name København, which means "Merchant's Harbor" in Danish.
Roskilde (?–1443): Named after King Roar.

Djibouti:

Djibouti: Named after the bottom point of the Gulf of Tadjoura. Possibly derived from the Afar word gabouti, a type of doormat made of palm fibres. Another plausible, but unproven, etymology is that "Djibouti" means "Land of Tehuti" or Land of Thoth, after the Egyptian moon god.
Obock (1862 – April 1892): The original name of the place is Afar Ḥáyyu or Ḥayyú ("enough") and refers to the mangroves which used to be there and ensured survival of camels in times of drought. In 1862 France purchased Obock from the local Afar sultans and created a coaling station for ships. Thus began the colonization of present-day Djibouti. Oboḫ is derived from 'As Ōbóki, a designation for the middle section of Oued Dár'i. Obock was the first capital of the Territoire d'Obock, but since there was little water there, in 1881 the colonial administration made the city of Djibouti its new center.

Dominica:

Roseau: "Reed" in French.
Portsmouth (1765–1768): Named after Portsmouth, United Kingdom.

Dominican Republic:

Santo Domingo de Guzmán: Named after a saint of the same name. Known as Ciudad Trujillo (named after Rafael Trujillo) from 1930 to 1961.
La Isabela (1493–1496): "Elizabeth" in Spanish.
Santiago de los Caballeros (1863–1865): "St. James of the Knights" in Spanish. The first city to be named "Santiago" in the Americas.

== E ==
East Timor:

Dili
Lifau (1695 – October 10, 1769)
Solor (1642–1695)

Ecuador:

Quito: Named after the Quitu tribe. The name is a combination of two Tsafiki words: "Quitso" ("center") and "To" ("the world"); hence, therefore "Quito" probably means "center of the world."
Riobamba (November 4, 1859 – January 12, 1960): The Rio part of the name means "River" and the Bamba part of the name has an unknown meaning.

Egypt:

Cairo: From Arabic القاهرة al-Qāhira, meaning "The Victorious."
al-Fustat (905–969): The city's name comes from the Arabic word فسطاط fusṭāṭ which means a large tent or pavilion. According to tradition, the location of Fustat was chosen by a bird: A dove laid an egg in the tent of 'Amr ibn al-'As, the Muslim conqueror of Egypt, just before he was to march on Alexandria. His camp at that time was just north of the Roman fortress of Babylon. Amr declared this as a sign from God, and the tent was left untouched as he and his troops went off to battle. When they returned victorious, Amr told his soldiers to pitch their tents around his, giving his new capital city its name, Miṣr al-Fusṭāṭ, or Fusṭāṭ Miṣr, popularly translated as "City of the tents", though this is not an exact translation. The word Miṣr was an ancient Semitic root designating Egypt, but in Arabic also has the meaning of a large city or metropolis (or, as a verb, "to civilize"), so the name Miṣr al-Fusṭāṭ could mean "Metropolis of the Tent". Fusṭāṭ Miṣr would mean "The Pavilion of Egypt". Egyptians to this day call Cairo "Miṣr", or, colloquially, Maṣr, even though this is properly the name of the whole country of Egypt. The country's first Islamic mosque, the Mosque of Amr, was later built on the same site of the commander's tent, in 642.
al-Qatta'i (868–905): From Arabic القطائـع, meaning "The Quarters" in Arabic.
al-'Askar (750–868 AD): From Arabic العسكر, meaning "The Guard" or "The Soldier."
Alexandria (332 BC–641 AD): Named after Alexander the Great.

For older capitals and their etymologies, see List of historical capitals of Egypt.

El Salvador:

San Salvador: "Holy Savior" in Spanish, referring to Jesus Christ of Nazareth.

Equatorial Guinea:

Ciudad de la Paz: "City of Peace" in Spanish. A planned city with the intent to create a modern administrative capital on the mainland. It was previously known as Djibloho ("Bridge" in the local Fang language and the name of the province in which it is located) or Oyala (a historical name for the region).
Malabo (1963-2026): After Malabo Lopelo Melaka (1837–1937), last king of the Bubi. The city was known as Santa Isabel (Saint Elizabeth) from 1855 to 1973 and Port Clarence from 1827 to 1855.
Bata (1959–1963): "Possibly" from Spanish "bata" meaning "gown."

Eritrea:

Asmara/Asmera: "Live in Peace" in Tigre.
Massawa (1890–1935)

Estonia:

Tallinn: The Estonian name Tallinn is generally believed to be derived from Taani linn (originally meaning "Danish Castle", now "Danish Town") after the Danes built the castle in place of the Estonian Lindanise stronghold of Revala county. However, it also could have come from Talilinn ("Winter Castle" or "Winter Town"), or Talulinn (originally "Home Castle or "Home Town", now "Farm Town"). See etymology of Tallinn. The German name Reval is derived from the adjacent Revala county.

Eswatini (Swaziland):

Mbabane: It derives its name from a chief, Mbabane Kunene, who lived in the area when British settlers arrived.
Bremensdorp (1890–1906): "Bremer's Village" in Afrikaans.
Elangeni (1818–1893): "The Sun" in Swazi.
Lobamba (royal legislative capital): Etymology unknown.

Ethiopia:

Addis Ababa: From Amharic ኣዲስ ኣበባ, meaning "New Flower."
Entoto (1880–1889): Named after Mount Entoto.
Magdala (1855–1880): (from Aramaic מגדלא Magdala, meaning "elegant", "great", or "magnificent"; and Hebrew מגדל Migdal, meaning "tower"; Arabic قرية الممجدل, Qaryat Al Majdal)
Gonder (1636–1855): Etymology unknown.
Danqaz (?–1636): Etymology unknown.
Tegulat (1270–?): Etymology unknown.
Lalibela (11??–12??): From Amharic ላሊበላ, meaning "A person who talks too much."
Nazaret (????–????): Named after Nazareth, Israel.
Axum (250–?): Etymology unknown.

== F ==
Fiji:

Suva: Etymology unknown.
Levuka (1871–1877): Probably meaning "Little Island" in Fijian.

Finland:

Helsinki: From Old Norse Helsingfors (Helsing, a local tribe, plus fors meaning stream).
Turku (?–1812): Its name originated from an Old East Slavic word, tǔrgǔ, meaning "market place".

France:

Paris: Named after the Parisii tribe.
Vichy (1940–1944): There are 4 suggested etymologies for Vichy:
- Celtic "Virtue water" Wich or Gwich'in (virtue) and y (water).
- Latin Vicus calidus with subsequent deformation of Vicus.
- Gallo-Roman Vipiacus (Vipius field), with phonetic change to Vichiacus in the Middle Ages.
- Vici, Latin plural for a group of villages: the c is pronounced ch and the final -i becomes -y by orthographic normalization. This is the simplest and most plausible explanation, advanced by Louis Nadeau in 1869.

== G ==
Gabon:

Libreville: "Free town" in French.
Fort d'Aumale (1843–1849): "Fort of Aumale" in French.

Gambia:

Banjul: Banjul takes its name from the Mandé people who gathered specific fibres on the island which were used in the manufacture of ropes. Bang julo is the Mandinka (Mande) word for fibre. The mispronunciation led to the word Banjul. The city was known as Bathurst (named in honor of Henry Bathurst) from 1816 to April 14, 1973.
Fort James (1661–1765): Named in honor of King James II of England.

Georgia:

Tbilisi: From Georgian თბილისი, meaning "Warm Springs" or "Warm Location".

Germany:

Berlin (1990–present): Etymology unknown, but may be related to the Old Polabian stem berl-/birl- "swamp".
Bonn (1949–1990; seat of government 1990–1999): From Latin "Bonna", may stem from the original population of this and many other settlements in the area, the Eburoni.

Ghana:

Accra: The word Accra is derived from the word Nkran meaning "ants" in Akan, a reference to the numerous anthills seen in the countryside around Accra.
Osu (1874–1877)
Cape Castle (1664–1874)
Kormantin/Abanze (1621–1664)

Greece:

Athens (1834–present): Uncertain etymology. In Ancient Greek the name of the city was Ἀθῆναι (Athênai, pronounced [atʰɛ̂ːnai̯] in Classical Attic), although in earlier Greek, such as Homeric Greek, the name had been current in the singular form though, as Ἀθήνη (Athḗnē). Modern scholars now generally agree that Athena, the Greek goddess of wisdom, takes her name from the city rather than the other way around, because the ending -ene is common in names of locations, but rare for personal names.

named after .

Nauplion (1821–1834): Katharevousa Greek Ναύπλιον from Attic Greek Ναυπλία Nauplia of unknown etymology.

Grenada:

St. George's: "Belonging to Saint George".

Guatemala:

Guatemala City: The origin of the name "Guatemala" is the =Nahuatl word Quauhtemallan meaning "forested land". This was the name that the Nahuatl-speaking Mexican allies of the Spanish conquistadors used for Iximche, the Kaqchikel Maya capital that the Spanish adopted as their colonial city.
Nueva Guatemala de la Asunción (1775–1821): "New Guatemala of the Assumption" in Spanish.
Santiago de los Caballeros de Guatemala (1527–1775): "St. James of the Knights of Guatemala" in Spanish.
Tecpán Guatemala (1524–1527): Derived from the Nahuatl name Tecpán Quauhtemallan, applied by the Mexican allies of the Spanish. Tecpán is Nahuatl for "palace", so the name of the new town translated as "the palace among the trees".

Guinea:

Conakry: According to a legend, the name of the city comes from the fusion of the name "Cona", a wine and cheese producer of the Baga people, and the word "nakiri", which means in Sosso the other bank or side.
Saint Louis, Senegal (1849–1891): Named after a saint of the same name. The city's Wolof name is Ndar.

Guinea-Bissau:

Bissau
Boe (1973–1974)
Bolama (1879–1942)

Guyana:

Georgetown: Named after King George III. The city was known as Stabroek from 1784 to May 5, 1812.

== H ==
Haiti:

Port-au-Prince (1749–1793 and 1804–present): "Port to the Prince" in French.
Port-Républicain (1793–1804): "Republican Port" in French.
Port de Paix (1749–1793): "Port of Peace" in French.
Tortue (1641–1676): "Turtle" or "Tortoise" in French.

Honduras:

Tegucigalpa: The exact meaning of Tegucigalpa has yet to be determined. The most widespread theory is that it comes from the Nahuatl Teguz-Galp, which means "silver hills", but it is difficult to sustain as the natives were ignorant of the existence of minerals in the area. Togogalpa refers to the "tototi", a green parakeet, in Nahuatl. Toncontín, a town not far from Tegucigalpa, has the same name as a Mexican dance of Nahuatl origin that was used in the 17th-century Baroque theatre. In Mexico there is a belief that Tegucigalpa derives from Nahuatl Tecuztlicallipan, "place of residence of the noble" or Tecuhtzincalpan, "place at the home of the beloved master". The Honduran philologist Alberto Membreño argued that it derived from a Nahuatl word meaning "in the houses of the sharp stones". He also notes that in colonial times, Taguzgalpa was the name used for the region of eastern Honduras, including today's department of Gracias a Dios and part of the departments of Olancho, Colon and El Paraiso.
Comayagua (1573–1824, alternate until October 30, 1880): Comayagua's name derives from the indigenous language 'Lenca' which means "Moor of abundant water."
Gracias a Dios (1544–1549): "Thanks be to God" in Spanish.
Trujillo (1525–1544 and 1549–1573): Named after Trujillo, Cáceres, Spain.

Hungary:

Budapest: Formed in 1872 from the merger of two cities on opposite shores of the Danube: Buda and Pest. Pest is a Slavic name meaning "furnace, oven, cove" (cf. Rus. Печь pech').
Pozsony (1536–1848): See Bratislava below.
Buda (1265–1536): The name Buda takes its name from the name of the ruler Bleda the Hun, whose name is also Buda in Hungarian. The Roman name for Buda was Aquincum ("aqua" means "water" in Latin.)
Székesfehérvár and Esztergom (1000–1256): The name Székesfehérvár means "white castle with the chair/seat" and the city is known by translations of this in other languages (Latin :Alba Regia, German :Stuhlweißenburg, Slovak :Stoličný Belehrad, Serbian :Стони Београд Stoni Beograd, Croatian : Stolni Biograd, Slovene : Stolni Belograd, Czech: Stoličný Bělehrad, Polish: Białogród Stołeczny or Białogród Królewski, Turkish: İstolni Belgrad). In Hungarian, the city is known colloquially as Fehérvár. The word szék (meaning "seat" as "throne") is related to its important role in the 1st centuries of the Kingdom of Hungary: székhely means a (royal) residence, center. In accordance with the obligation from the Doctrine of the Holy Crown, the first kings of Hungary were crowned and buried here. The Roman town was called Solva. The name Esztergom was first mentioned in documents in 1079. Some think the name comes from Isztergam ('Ister' meaning Danube and Gam referring to the nearby river Garam). The town is the seat of Etzel / Attila in the Niebelungenlied as Gran (German: Gran (help·info)). In Croatian Ostrogon, in Polish Ostrzyhom, in Slovak Ostrihom, in Medieval Latin Strigonium, and in Turkish Estergon. In around 1250, the town was known to Germans as Österheim; another hypothesis could see a similar-sounding original earlier name of Germanic origin, later to be Magyarized in Esztergom.

== I ==
Iceland:

Reykjavík: "Smoky Bay" in Icelandic.
Thingvellir (meeting site of Althing 930–1800): "Parliament Meadows" in Icelandic.

India:

New Delhi (1911–present): See "Delhi" below.
Simla (summer capital 1911–1947; now spelled Shimla): named after the Hindu Goddess Shyamala Devi.
Calcutta (1774 – December 12, 1911; present-day Kolkata): Derived from Kalikata, the name of one of the three villages (Kalikata, Sutanuti, Govindapur) in the area before the arrival of the British. "Kalikata", in turn, is believed to be a version of Kalikshetra (কালীক্ষেত্র, "Land of [the goddess] Kali"). Alternatively, the name may have been derived from the Bengali term kilkila ("flat area"). Again, the name may have its origin in the indigenous term for a natural canal, Khal, followed by Katta (which may mean dug). Another theory is that the place used to specialize in quicklime (kalicun) and coir rope (kátá) and hence the place was called Kalikátá.
Delhi (1192–1327, 1344–1501, and 1648–1858): the etymology of "Delhi" is uncertain, but many possibilities exist. The most common view is that its eponym is Dhillu or Dilu, a king of the Mauryan dynasty, who built the city in 50 BCE and named it after himself. The Hindi/Prakrit word dhili ("loose") was used by the Tuar Rajputs to refer to the city because the Iron Pillar built by Raja Dhava had a weak foundation and was replaced. The coins in circulation in the region under the Rajputs were called dehliwal. Some other historians believe that the name is derived from Dilli, a corruption of dehleez or dehali—Hindi for 'threshold'—and symbolic of the city as a gateway to the Indo-Gangetic Plains. Another theory suggests that the city's original name was Dhillika.
Ajmer (1613–1616): Derived from Sanskrit अजय-मेरु meaning "Invincible Spine".
Fatehpur Sikri (1570–1585): The name Fateh is Arabic in origin and means "victory", also in the Urdu and Persian languages. The name means "City of Victory". The city was founded in 1569 by the Mughal emperor Akbar, and served as the capital of the Mughal Empire from 1571 to 1585.
Agra (1501–1540): Derived from Sanskrit Agrevaṇa (अग्रेवण), or 'the border of the forest'. The name was first mentioned in the epic Mahābhārata.
Daulatabad (1327–1344): from Persian دولت‌آباد meaning "City of Prosperity".
Chennai: Etymology disputed. There are two different theories for the origin of the name Chennai:
- The first theory is that it was derived from the name of a ruler Damarla Chennappa Nayakudu, Nayaka of Chandragiri and Vandavasi, father of Damarla Venkatadri Nayakudu, from whom the English acquired the town in 1639. The first official use of the name Chennai is said to be in a sale deed, dated 8 August 1639, to Francis Day of the East India Company.
- The second theory states that it was named after the Chenna Kesava Perumal Temple; the word chenni in Tamil means face, with the temple regarded as the face of the city. The former name of the city is Madras.

The name Madras originated even before the British presence was established in India.
Multiple explanations attempt to account for the city's colonial name, Madras:
- Allegedly it derived from Madraspattinam, a fishing village north of Fort St George. However, it is uncertain whether the name 'Madraspattinam' was in use before the arrival of European influence.
- The military mapmakers believed Madras was originally Mundir-raj, or abbreviatedly, Mundiraj.
- Other arguments suggest that the Portuguese, who arrived in the area in the 16th century, named the village Madre de Deus, meaning Mother of God.
- Another possibility sees the village's name comes from the prominent Madeiros family of Portuguese origin, which consecrated the Madre de Deus Church in the Santhome locality of Chennai in 1575.
- Another theory concludes that the name Madras was given to Chennapattanam after it was taken from a similarly named Christian priest.
- Other parties express the opinion that Madras might have taken its name from a fisherman by the name of Madrasan from religious Muslim schools, referred to as Madrasahs, from the word Madhu-ras, which means "honey" in Sanskrit.

Indonesia:

Jakarta: The city's name is derived from the Sanskrit word "Jayakarta" (जयकर्) which translates as "victorious deed", "complete act,"or "complete victory." The city was known as Djakarta from August 17, 1945 to 1971 and Batavia from 1619 to August 1945 and from 1947 to December 1949. Batavia is named after a region in the Netherlands which was named after the Batavi tribe who inhabited that area.
Yogyakarta (January 1946 – August 1950): The city's name is derived from the Sanskrit word योग्य जय कर्ता meaning "Sufficient Victorious Deed".
Bukittinggi (During the Indonesian National Revolution, the city was the headquarters for the Emergency Government of the Republic of Indonesia (PDRI) from December 19, 1948 to July 13, 1949): Indonesian for "high hill".

Iran:

Tehran: Derived from Persian تهران (Tehrān) meaning "modern".
Shiraz (1750–1788): The earliest reference to the city is on Elamite clay tablets dated to 2000 BC, found in June 1970, while digging to make a kiln for a brick factory in the southwestern corner of the city. The tablets written in ancient Elamite name a city called Tiraziš. Phonetically, this is interpreted as /tiračis/ or /ćiračis/. This name became Old Persian /širājiš/; through regular sound change comes the modern Persian name Shirāz. The name Shiraz also appears on clay sealings found at a 2nd-century AD Sassanid ruin, east of the city. By some of the native writers, the name Shiraz was derived from a son of Tahmuras, the third Shāh (King) of the world according to Ferdowsi's Shāhnāma.
Mashhad (مشهد) (1750–1736): literally the place of martyrdom in Persian.
Isfahan (1598–1736): A variant of Sepahan, meaning "The Armies".
Qazvin (1548–1598): Derived from the word کس Cas meaning "people".
Tabriz (1295–1305 and 1469–1538): According to some sources, including Encyclopædia Britannica, the name Tabriz derives from "tap-riz" ("causing heat to flow" in Iranian languages), from the many thermal springs in the area. Other sources claim that in AD 246, to avenge his brother's death, king Khosraw I of Armenia defeated Ardashir I of the Sassanid Empire and changed the name of the city from Shahistan to Tauris, deriving from "ta-vrezh" ("this revenge" in Grabar). In AD 297, it became the capital of Tiridates III, king of Armenia. However, this story has popular origin and no ancient source has recorded such an event. This is based on accounts of Vardan, the Armenian historian in the 14th century.

Iraq:

Baghdad (بغداد): "Given by God" in Persian. There have been several rival proposals as to its specific etymology. The most reliable and most widely accepted among these is that the name is a Persian compound of Bağ "garden" + dād "fair", translating to "The fair Garden", or Persian compound of Bag "god" + dād "given", translating to "God-given" or "God's gift", whence Modern Persian Baγdād. This in turn can be traced to Old Persian and Sanskrit Bhaagadata. Another leading proposal is that the name comes from Middle Persian Bāgh-dād "The Given Garden". The name is pre-Islamic and the origins are unclear, but it is related to previous settlements which did not have any political or commercial power, making it a virtually new foundation in the time of the Abbasids. Mansur called the city "Madinat as-Salam", or "City of Peace", as a reference to paradise. This was the official name on coins, weights, and other things.

Ireland:

Dublin: Derived from Irish Dubb Linn meaning "Black pool". The city's native name Baile Átha Cliath means "Town of the Hurdled Ford".

Israel:

Jerusalem: via Latin Hierosolyma and Greek Ἱεροσόλυμα/ Ιερουσαλήμ Hierousalem, ultimately from Canaanite languages and Hebrew יְרוּשָׁלַיִם Yerushaláyim meaning "abode of Shalim." Derived from a compound of two Semitic base words: yarah ("y-r-h") "he threw, cast"+shalim ("s-l-m").

Italy:

Rome: The legendary origin of the city's name is the traditional founder and first ruler. It is said that Romulus and Remus decided to build a city. After an argument, Romulus killed his brother Remus. Then he named it after himself, Rome. More recently, attempts have been made to find a linguistic root for the name Rome. Possibilities include derivation from Greek language Ῥώμη meaning bravery, courage; possibly the connection is with a root *rum-, "teat", with possible reference to the totem wolf that adopted and suckled the cognately named twins Romulus and Remus. Etruscan gives us the word Rumach, "from Rome", from which Ruma can be extracted. Its further etymology, as with that of most Etruscan words, remains unknown. The Basque scholar Manuel de Larramendi thought that the origin could be related to the Basque language word orma (modern Basque kirreal), "wall".
Brindisi (September 9, 1943 – February 1944): The Latin name Brundisium comes from the Greek Brentesion (Βρεντήσιον) meaning "deer's head", which refers to the shape of the natural harbor.
Florence (1865 – December 1, 1870): Derived from "Florentia" meaning "the flourishing" in Latin.
Turin (1861–1865): Named after the Taurini people. Their name could be derived from taurus, meaning "the bull", or from the Celtic verb tau meaning "mountain".

== J ==
Jamaica:

Kingston: "King's Town"
Spanish Town (1692–1872): Known as Santiago de la Vega ('St. James of the fertile plain') from 1535 to 1655.
Port Royal (1655–1692)
Sevilla la Nueva (1510–1523): "New Seville" in Spanish. Seville is derived from the city's Roman name Hispalis, via the Arabic إشبيلية Išbīliya.

Japan:

Tokyo: From Japanese 東京 meaning "Eastern Capital."
Kyoto (794 – September 3, 1868): From Japanese 京都 meaning "Capital City."

Jordan:

Amman: "Place of Tremors."

== K ==
Kazakhstan:

Astana: From Kazakh Астана, meaning "capital city."
Nur-Sultan (2019–2022): a renaming of Astana, named after the first president of an independent Kazakhstan, Nursultan Nazarbayev after he stepped down in March of 2019. Nursultan is from Arabic for sultan of light.
Akmola (1997 – May 6, 1998): a previous name of Astana. Akmola (in Kazakh Ақмола) means 'white burial'.
Almaty (1993 – December 10, 1997): The name "Almaty" derives from the Kazakh word for "apple" (алма), and thus is often translated as "full of apples". The older Soviet-era Russian version of its name, Alma-Ata, originates from the saint's tomb, buried in an apple orchard, whence the name, "Saint of the Apple (orchard)" or "Father of Apples". "Ata" standing for father in Kazakh and many other Turkic languages, also stands for a saint or a priest, like "padre" in the Romance languages. The old name for the new capital of Kazakhstan, Astana was Akmolinsk/Akmola, "White Shrine/Mausoleum", also a reference to a saint's burial ground.
In fact, in the region surrounding Almaty, there is a great genetic diversity among the wild apples; the region is thought to be the ancestral home of the apple, and the wild Malus sieversii is considered a likely candidate for the ancestor of the modern domestic apple. The area is often visited by researchers and scientists from around the world to learn more about the complex systems of genetics and discover the true beginnings of the domestic apple.
Orenburg (1919–1924; now in Russia): German for "Or fortress."
Kzyl-Orda (1925–1929): Kyzylorda was founded in 1820 as a Kokand fortress of Ak-Mechet (also spelt Aq Masjid, Aq Mechet, 'white mosque'). Yaqub Beg was the fort's commander until it was taken by the Russian troops of General Vasily Alekseevich Perovsky in 1853. The Russians renamed the fort Fort Perovsky (Russian: Форт Перовский,1853–1867). Since 1867, it was the city of Perovsk (Russian: Перовск); since 1922, Ak-Mechet (Ак-Мечеть) again. In 1925, the city became Kzzyl-Orda, from Kazakh Қызыл qyzyl 'red' and орда orda 'center', 'capital city'.

Kenya:

Nairobi: The name "Nairobi" comes from the Maasai phrase Enkare Nairobi, which literally means "cold water", the Maasai name of the stream now known as the Nairobi River. The city takes its name from the name of the river. However, it is popularly known as the "Green City in the Sun" and is surrounded by several expanding villa suburbs.
Mombasa (1888–1895): The original Arabic name is منبعثة Manbasa; in Swahili it is called Kisiwa Cha Mvita (or Mvita for short), which means "Island of War", due to the many changes in its ownership.

Kiribati:

Tarawa
Butaritari (1897 – January 27, 1916)
Tapiri (January 17, 1916–1925)
Bairiki (1945 – July 12, 1976)

North Korea:

Pyongyang: From Korean 평양, meaning "Flat Land". Both words are derived from Chinese.
Sinuiju (October 21 – ?, 1950): From Korean 신의주, meaning "New Ŭiju".
Kanggye (1950–1953): From Korean 강계시, meaning "River Boundary", ultimately from Chinese.

South Korea:

Seoul: From Korean 서울, meaning "Capital". The city has been known in the past by the names Wirye-seong (위례성; 慰禮城, Baekje era), Hanju (한주; 漢州, Silla era), Namgyeong (남경; 南京, Goryeo era), Hanseong (한성; 漢城, Baekje and Joseon era), Hanyang (한양; 漢陽, Joseon era), and Gyeongseong (경성; 京城, Japanese occupation era). Its current name originated from the Korean word meaning "capital city", which is believed to be derived from Seorabeol (서라벌; 徐羅伐), which originally referred to Gyeongju, the capital of Silla.
Unlike most place names in Korea, "Seoul" has no corresponding hanja (Chinese characters used in the Korean language). The recently chosen Chinese name for Seoul is 首尔 (simplified), 首爾 (traditional) (Shǒuěr), which sounds somewhat similar to "Seoul" when pronounced in Mandarin Chinese.
See Names of Seoul
Daegu (June 28 – July 20, 1950): From Korean 대구, meaning "a large hill".
Busan (July 20, 1950–1952): From Korean 부산, meaning "a cauldron mountain".

Kosovo:

Pristina: The name of the city is derived from the personal name *Prišьkъ (preserved in the Kajkavian surname Prišek, in the Old Polish personal name Przyszek, and in the Polish surname Przyszek) and the derivational suffix -ina 'belonging to X and his kin'. The name is most likely a patronymic of the personal name *Prišь, preserved as a surname in Polish Przysz and Sorbian Priš, a hypocoristic of the Slavic personal name Pribyslavъ. A false etymology connects the name Priština with Serbo-Croatian prišt (пришт), meaning 'ulcer' or 'tumor', referring to its 'boiling'. However, this explanation cannot be correct, as Slavic place names ending in -ina corresponding to an adjective and/or name of an inhabitant lacking this suffix are built from personal names or denote a person and never derive, under these conditions, from common nouns (SNOJ 2007: loc. cit.). The inhabitants of this city are called Prishtinali or Prishtinas in Albanian; in standard Serbian they are called Prištinci (Приштинци) or Prištevci (Приштевци).

Kuwait:

Kuwait City: Its name may have derived from an earlier abandoned fort located there, called "Kūt" (كوت) – Arabic for a fortress by the sea.
Kadhima (August 28, 1990 – February 26, 1991)

Kyrgyzstan:

Bishkek: The name is thought to derive from a Kyrgyz word for a churn used to make fermented mare's milk (kumis), the Kyrgyz national drink. Founded in 1825 as the Kyrgyz-Khokand fortress of "Bishkek", then, in 1862, named as the Russian fortress Pishpek (крепость Пишпек), between 1926 and 1991 it was known as Frunze (Фрунзе), after the Bolshevik military leader Mikhail Frunze. The historic name of the city was restored by the Kyrgyz parliament in 1991.

== L ==
Laos:

Vientiane: French pronunciation of its Lao name ວຽງຈັນ Viang-Chang meaning "City of Sandalwood."
Luang Prabang (Royal capital 1945–1947): From Lao ຫລວງພະບາງ Luaang-Pha'baang, meaning "Royal Buddha Image" (in the Dispelling Fear Mudra).

Latvia:

Riga: One theory for the origin of the name Riga is that it is a corrupted borrowing from the Liv ringa meaning loop, referring to the ancient natural harbour formed by the tributary loop of the Daugava. The other is that Riga owes its name to this already-established role in commerce between East and West, as a borrowing of the Latvian rija, for warehouse, the "j" becoming a "g" in German—notably, Riga is called Rie by English geographer Richard Hakluyt (1589), and German historian Dionysius Fabricius (1610) confirms the origin of Riga from rija. Another theory could be that Riga was named after Riege, the German name for the River Rīdzene, a tributary of the Daugava.

Lebanon:

Beirut: Derived from Phoenician word 𐤁𐤓𐤕 "Be’rot" meaning "fountain." Cognate with the Hebrew ביירות, lit. "the wells", from בארות "be'erot", plural of בְּאֵר "be'er" ("well"). Similarly, this word exists in the Arabic singular for "well" (بئر), implying an early Semitic root.

Lesotho:

Maseru: "Place of the Red Sandstone" in Sesotho.
Thaba Bosiu (July 1824 – March 11, 1969): "Mountain of Night" in Sesotho.
Butha-Buthe (1822–1824): "City of Lying Down" in Sesotho.

Liberia:

Monrovia: Named after then current United States President James Monroe.
Thompson Town (1821–1824)

Libya:

Tripoli: Derived from Τρίπολη/Τρίπολις; meaning "Three Cities" in Greek.
Benghazi (co-capital 1951–1972): Named after the benefactor Sidi Ghazi.

Liechtenstein:

Vaduz: Vaduz was first mentioned in 1150. The name of Vaduz is either of Romansh origin (avadutg, "water", from Latin aquaeductus) or developed from Valdutsch – from Latin vallis (valley), and High German diutisk (German).

Lithuania:

Vilnius (1323–1919, 1919–1920, and 1939–present): Named after the Vilnia River. The name of the river derives from the Lithuanian language word vilnis ("a surge"); verb vilnyti ("to surge").
Kaunas (1920–1939): The city's name is of Lithuanian origins and most likely derives from a personal name.
Voruta (c. 1251): "Castle" in Lithuanian.

Luxembourg:

Luxembourg City (Luxembourgish: Stad Lëtzebuerg; French: Luxembourg-Ville; German: Luxemburg-Stadt): From Celtic Lucilem "small" (cognate to English "little") and Germanic Burg: "castle", thus Lucilemburg: "little castle".

Later forms of the name were: Lütze(l)burg, Lëtzelburg (cf. Luxembourgish: Lëtzebuerg).

The evolution towards the originally French versions of the name using the letter X instead of TZ or TS (Luxembourg, Luxemburg), which were adopted by most languages (but not by Luxembourgish itself), was the result of the French cultural influence throughout Europe since the 17th century.

Luxembourg and Liechtenstein are the only *German-speaking former member monarchies of the de facto confederal "Holy Roman Empire" (961–1806) which were not assimilated or annexed by Germany, Austria or Switzerland.

(* In the case of Luxembourg, German is – for historical reasons – one of the three official administrative languages, after Luxembourgish and French. German is NOT the national mother tongue of the Luxembourgish people.)

== M ==
Madagascar:

Antananarivo: "City of the Thousand" from the number of soldiers assigned to guard it. The name was given to the city by King Adrianjaka. Also known as Tananarive from 1883 to December 30, 1975. Tananarive serves as the city's French name and is still in use today.

Malawi:

Lilongwe: Named after the Lilongwe River.
Zomba (1889 – January 1, 1975)

Malaysia:

Kuala Lumpur (كوالا لومڤور): "Muddy Confluence" in Malay. The original name for this city was "Pengkalan Lumpur", which means bundle of mud.
Putrajaya (administrative capital since 2002): Named after the first Malaysian Prime Minister, Tunku Abdul Rahman Putra. The city is situated within the Multimedia Super Corridor, beside the also newly developed Cyberjaya. The development started in 1995 and today major landmarks are completed, and the population is expected to grow in the relatively new city. The "jaya" (जय) part of the city's name means "victory" in Sanskrit.

Maldives:

Malé: Derived from Sanskrit महालय Mahaalay meaning "Big House".

Mali:

Bamako: "Crocodile River" in Bambara.
Kayes (1880–1908): The name "Kayes" comes from the Soninké word "karré", which describes a low humid place that floods in rainy season.
Dakar (1959–1960; now in Senegal): See Dakar below.

Malta:

Valletta: The city is named for Jean Parisot de la Valette, the Grand Master of the Order of Saint John (crusader knights), who succeeded in defending the island from an Ottoman invasion in 1565.
Mdina (?–1566): Derived from Arabic مدينة "Medina" meaning "Old Town."

Marshall Islands:

Majuro

Mauritania:

Nouakchott: Believed to have been derived from Berber Nawākšūṭ meaning "The place of the winds".
Saint Louis, Senegal (1903–1960)

Mauritius:

Port Louis: Named after King Louis XV.
Port-Napoléon (1806–1810): Named after Napoleon Bonaparte.
Port-de-la-Montagne (1792–1795): "Port of the Mountain" in French.

Mexico:

Mexico City: See Toponymy of Mexico.

Federated States of Micronesia:

Palikir
Kolonia (till 1989)
Colonia (1887 – November 4, 1889): Named after Cologne, Germany.

Moldova:

Chişinău: According to one version, the name comes from the archaic Romanian word chişla (meaning "spring", "source of water") and nouă ("new"), because it was built around a small spring. Nowadays, the spring is located at the corner of Pushkin and Albişoara streets.

Monaco:

Monaco-Ville: Monaco's name comes from the nearby Phocaean Greek colony, in the 6th century. Referred to the Ligurians as Monoikos, from the Greek μόνοικος "single house", from μόνος "alone, single" + οίκος "house", which bears the sense of a people either settled in a "single habitation" or of "living apart" from others. Another Greek word etymologically related to the name of this principality is μόνaκος which means "alone" from which the word monastery and monasticism are derived. According to an ancient myth, Hercules passed through the Monaco area and turned away the previous gods. As a result, a temple was constructed there, the temple of Hercules Monoikos. Because the only temple of this area was the "House" of Hercules, the city was called Monoikos.

Mongolia:

Ulaanbaatar: From Mongolian Улаанбаатар, ᠤᠯᠠᠭᠠᠨ ᠪᠠᠭᠠᠲᠤᠷ, meaning "The Red Hero." Ulan Bator has had numerous names in its history. From 1639 to 1706, it was known as Örgöö (also spelled Urga) (Mongolian: Өргөө, residence), and from 1706–1911 as Ikh Khüree (Mongolian: Их = "great", Хүрээ = "camp"), Da Khüree (also spelled Da Khure) or simply Khüree. Upon independence in 1911, with both the secular government and the Bogd Khan's palace present, the city's name changed to Niislel Khüree (Mongolian: Нийслэл = "capital", Хүрээ = "camp").
When the city became the capital of the new Mongolian People's Republic in 1924, its name was changed to Ulaanbaatar (Улаанбаатар, classical script:, Ulaγan Baγatur), literally "red hero"), in honor of Mongolia's national hero Damdin Sükhbaatar, whose warriors, shoulder-to-shoulder with the Soviet Red Army, liberated Mongolia from Ungern von Sternberg's troops and Chinese occupation. His statue still adorns Ulan Bator's central square.
In Europe and North America, Ulan Bator was generally known as Urga (from Örgöö) or sometimes Kuren (from Khüree) or Kulun (from 庫倫, the Chinese transcription of Khüree) before 1924, and Ulan Bator afterwards, after the Russian: Улан-Батор. The Russian spelling is different from the Mongolian because it was defined phonetically, and the Cyrillic script was only introduced in Mongolia seventeen years later. By Mongols, the city was nicknamed Aziin Tsagaan Dagina (White Maiden of Asia) in the late 20th century. It is now sometimes sarcastically called Utaanbaatar (Smog Hero), due to the heavy layer of smog in winter.
Khuree: (Mongolian: Хүрээ, Khüree, camp or monastery, simplified Chinese: 库伦; traditional Chinese: 庫倫; pinyin: Kùlún, also rendered as Kure, Kuren and other variants) (1706–1911)
Karakorum (1220–1267): From Mongolian Хар Хорум Каракорум, meaning "Black Mountain / Black Rock / black scree."

Montenegro:

Podgorica/Titograd: "Under the Small Hill" in Montenegrin. Known as Titograd (Named in honor of Josip Broz Tito) from 1946 to 1992.
Cetinje (1482–1946; Historic capital since October 12, 1992): Named after the River Cetina which runs through the city.
Obod (1475–1482)
Zabljak (1474–1475): The first Slav name of the place was "Varezina voda" (Варезина вода) possibly because of the ample source of drinkable water nearby, making a settlement possible. Later, the town was renamed "Hanovi" (originally "Anovi") because it was where caravans rested. The modern name dates from 1870, when in a single day the building of a school, church and captain's home began. However, almost all the original buildings were destroyed during the Balkan Wars. All that has remained is the old church of Sv. Preobraženje (Holy Transfiguration), built in 1862 as a monument to a Montenegrin victory in the battle against the Turks. After Žabljak was established as a town, stores and cafés were opened. As such, in the 1880s Žabljak became a market town, leading it to become administrative center of the region.
Antivari (1403–1408): In Serbian and Montenegrin, the town is known as Bar (Бар), in Italian and Greek as Antivari. The name of this city is connected to Bari, Italy as those cities are located on the opposite side of the Adriatic Sea.
Ulcinj (1385–1403): Named after the Olciniates tribe.
Prapratna (?–1042)

Morocco:

Rabat: From Arabic الرباط, meaning "Fortified Place."
Fez (1472–1524): From Arabic فاس, meaning "Walled City."
Meknes: Meknes is named after a Berber tribe which was known as Miknasa (native name: Imknasn) in the medieval Arabic sources.
Marrakesh (1524–1631): The probable origin of its name is from the Amazigh (Berber) words mur (n) akush (ⵎⵓⵔ ⵏ ⴰⵅⵓⵙⵂ), which means "Land of God". (The root "mur" is used now in the Berber languages mostly in the feminine form "tamurt"). The same word "mur" appears in the country Mauritania, but this interpretation is still unproven to this day.
Tafilalt (1631–1666): The name Tafilalt is a Berber name meaning "the Country of the Hilali", as its inhabitants are called, because they were descended from the Arabian tribe of Banu Hilal, who settled here.
Asilah (1465–1472): From Arabic أصيلة، أرزيلة, meaning "authentic."
Tetouan: The Berber name means literally "the eyes" and figuratively "the water springs".

Mozambique:

Maputo: Named after the clan M'Pfumo. The city was known as Lourenço Marques (1897 – February 3, 1976).
Sofala (1512–1554): Derived from the Swahili word "Cefala" meaning "River"
Kilwa (1501–1512): "With the Market" in Swahili.

Myanmar:

Naypyidaw/Nay Pyi Taw (Administrative capital since March 27, 2006): From Burmese နေပြည်တော်; translates as: "Great City of the Sun" or "Abode of Kings".
Yangon/Rangoon (1753–1760 and 1886–present): From Burmese ရန်ကုန, meaning "End of Strife." Compound of yan (ရန) "enemies" and koun (ကုန) "run out of".
Sagaing (1315–1364 and 1760–1764): Etymology unknown.
Ava (1364–1750 and 1764–1782): (Burmese: အင်းဝမြို့; MLCTS: ang: wa. mrui.; formerly Ava, and sometimes Ainwa) is a city in the Mandalay Division of Burma (Myanmar), situated just to the south of Amarapura on the Ayeyarwady River. Its formal title is Ratanapura (ရတနာပူရ; Pali: ऋअतनपुर), which means City of Gems in Pali. The name Innwa means mouth of the lake, which comes from in (အင်း), meaning lake, and wa (ဝ), which means mouth. Known as Ava to the British and A-wa (ဗ-တေ; mouth) in Burmese, it evolved to its modern name Innwa.
Amarapura (1782–1823 and 1841–1857): From Pali आमरपुर, meaning "City of Immortality."
Mandalay (1857–1886): The city gets its name from the nearby Mandalay Hill. The name is likely a derivative of a Pali word although the exact word of origin remains unclear. The root word has been speculated to be: Mandala (meaning, circular plains), Mandare (believed to mean "auspicious land"), or Mandara (a mountain from Hindu mythology).
When it was founded in 1857, the royal city was officially named Yadanabon (ရတနာပုံ), the Burmese version of its Pali name Ratanapura (ऋअतनपुर) which means "The City of Gems". It was also called Lay Kyun Aung Myei (လေးကျွန်းအောင်မြေ; Victorious Land over the Four Islands) and the royal palace, Mya Nan San Kyaw (မြနန်းစံကျော်; Famed Royal Emerald Palace).
Shwebo (1750–1753): Etymology unknown.

== N ==
Namibia:

Windhoek: The city of Windhoek is traditionally known by two names: /Ai//Gams, (Khoekhoe: hot springs) and Otjomuise (Otjiherero: place of steam). Both traditional names reference the hot springs near today's city centre.
Theories vary on how the place got its modern name of Windhoek. Most believe the name Windhoek is derived from the Afrikaans word Wind-Hoek (windy corner). Another theory suggests that Captain Jan Jonker Afrikaner named Windhoek after the Winterhoek Mountains, at Tulbagh in South Africa, where his ancestors had lived.
Grootfontein (May–July 1915): "Big Spring" in Afrikaans.
Otjimbingwe (1884–1891): The city's name is of Herero origin and is used to describe the Herero people.

Nauru: Yaren

Nepal:

Kathmandu: The city of Kathmandu is named after a structure in Durbar Square called the Kasthamandap. In Sanskrit, Kasth (काष्ठ) is "wood" and Mandap (मंडप/मण्डप) is "covered shelter." This unique temple, also known as Maru Sthal, was built in 1596 by King Laxmi Narsingh Malla. The entire structure contains no iron nails or supports and is made entirely from wood. Legend has it that the timber used for this two-story pagoda was obtained from a single tree.
Kathmandu is also sometimes called Kantipur. Kanti is an alternate name of the Goddess Lakshmi, and "pur" means the place where such a goddess resides. Thus, the name Kantipur demonstrates the ancient belief that it is the place where Lakshmi dwells.

Netherlands:

Amsterdam: Derived from Amstellerdam, meaning "A Dam on the Amstel River" in Dutch. The Amstel's name is derived from Aeme stelle, old Dutch for "area abounding with water".
The Hague: Derived from its Dutch name Den Haag, abbreviation for 's-Gravenhage, meaning "The Count's Woods".

New Zealand:

Wellington: Wellington was named after Arthur Wellesley, the first Duke of Wellington and victor of the Battle of Waterloo. The Duke's title comes from the town of Wellington in the English county of Somerset. In Māori, Wellington goes by three names. Te Whanga-nui-a-Tara refers to Wellington Harbour and means "the great harbour of Tara". Pōneke is a transliteration of Port Nick, short for Port Nicholson (the city's central marae, the community supporting it and its kapa haka have the pseudo-tribal name of Ngāti Pōneke). Te Upoko-o-te-Ika-a-Māui, meaning The Head of the Fish of Māui (often shortened to Te Upoko-o-te-Ika), a traditional name for the southernmost part of the North Island, derives from the legend of the fishing up of the island by the demi-god Māui.
Auckland (1841 – February 1865): Named in honor of George Eden, Earl of Auckland, then Viceroy of India. In Māori, Auckland is Tamaki Makaurau, which means 'strategic features desired by many'.
Old Russell (1840–1841): Named after Lord John Russell.

Nicaragua: (1821–1857 alternating between Conservative govts.: Granada and Liberal govts.: León)

Managua: The name Managua originates from Mana-ahuac, which in the indigenous Nahuatl language translates to "adjacent to the water" or site "surrounded by water". The city stands today on an area historically inhabited by indigenous people centuries before the Spanish conquest of Central America in the 16th century.
Granada, Nicaragua: Named after Granada, Spain. The etymology of the name is disputed and could come from either Arabic (جران Gar-anat, "pilgrims hill" or Latin granatum, "pomegranate". The city's Latin name was Medina Garanata.
León (1524–1821): "Lion" in Spanish.

Niger:

Niamey (1903–1910; 1926–present): The quarter-Mouray Kwaratagui is the historic center of the city of Niamey. The region of Niamey was inhabited for a very long time by people like Voltaic Gourmantchés. But the founders of the village would be Maouri Niamey, Matankari from the late nineteenth century. They were installed on an island called Neni Goungou facing the current Niamey, before coming to settle on the left bank of the Niger, beside a tree that the village would later call Nia Niam ("The name of the tree and me" in Djerma), meaning shore where it draws water. The village of Niamey was inhabited by about 600 people in 1901 when the Lenfant mission arrived. With the arrival of French rule, the city began to prosper. Niamey was then the chief town of the circle Djerma which includes the area between the river and the Dallol Bosso. Niamey became Niger's capital December 28, 1926, replacing Zinder.
Zinder (1911–1926): Etymology unknown.
Sorbo Haoussa (1900–1903): Sorbo means "Service Tree" or "Sorb Apple" in Italian. Haoussa derives from the Hausa tribe.

Nigeria:

Lagos (1914 – December 12, 1991): "Lakes" in Portuguese.

North Macedonia:

Skopje: The name of Skopje derives from an ancient name that is attested in antiquity as Latin Scupi, the name of a classical era Greco-Roman frontier fortress town. It may go back further to a pre-Greek, Illyrian name. In modern times, the city was known by its Turkish name Üsküp (Ottoman Turkish: اسكوب) during the time of Ottoman rule and the Serbian form Skoplje during the time of the First Yugoslavia between 1912 and the 1940s. Since the 1950s, the official name of the city in Macedonian has been Skopje (Скопје), reflecting the Macedonian Cyrillic orthography for the local pronunciation. The city is called Shkup or Shkupi in Albanian, Skopie (Скопие) in Bulgarian and Skopia (Σκόπια) in Greek.
Ohrid (992–1018; now in North Macedonia): Named after Lake Ohrid which is of unknown origin.

Norway:

Oslo (1299–1624 and 1925–present; known as Christiania from 1624 to January 1, 1925): During the Middle Ages the name was initially spelt "Áslo" and later "Óslo". The earlier spelling suggests that the first component refers either to the Ekeberg ridge southeast of the town ("ås" in modern Norwegian), or to the Aesir. The most likely interpretations would therefore be either "the meadow beneath the ridge" or "the meadow of the gods". Both are equally plausible. See History of Oslo's name
Christiania: Named after King Christian IV.
Bergen (1070–1299): "Mountains" in Norwegian.
Trondheim (997–1070): "A good place called home" in Norwegian.

== O ==
Oman:

Muscat (مسقط, Masqaṭ): Possibly meaning "hidden."
Salalah (summer capital c.1920–1970): Derived from Arabic صلاة meaning "prayer."
Zanzibar (1840–1856): The name comes from the Arabic 'zanj' (زنج) meaning black and 'al bar' (البر) meaning "land."
Rustaq (رستاق): "Border Area" in Persian. (?–1711 and 1719–1779)
Al Hazam (الحزام): "Belt" in Arabic. (1711–1719)
Nizwa (6th–7th century and of Imamate 1913–1955): Historians can not agree on the origins of the name of the city. Some suggest the name was derived from the Arabic verb انزوا, which means being alone. Others say that the city was named after an old water spring.

== P ==
Palestine:

Jerusalem (القُدس): "Al Quds" in Arabic meaning 'the sacred'.

Pakistan:

Islamabad (اسلام آباد): The name "Islamabad" means "Abode of Islam". It is derived from two words: Islam (اسلام) and abad (آباد). Islam refers to the religion of Islam, Pakistan's state religion, and -abad is a Persian suffix meaning "cultivated place", indicating an inhabited abode, place, or city.
Rawalpindi (راولپنڈی) (provisional; August 1, 1960 – August 14, 1967): The name "Rawalpindi" translates to "Village of Rawals". It is derived from the words: Rawal (راول) and pindi (پنڈی). Rawal literally means the Rawal peoples and Piṇḍī is the Punjabi word for "village".
Karachi (1947 – August 1, 1960): The city was founded under the name of Kolachi-jo-Goth but the modern city is named in honour of Mai Kolachi. The name Karachee, is a shortened and corrupted version of the original name Kolachi-jo-Goth.

Palau:

Ngerulmud (since October 7, 2006): From the Palauan meaning "place of fermented mud" (mud being the native name for Centropyge tibicen, the keyhole angelfish). Before being chosen as the site of the new capitol, Ngerulmud was the name given to a large hill in sight of the ocean on which women would communally gather to offer fermented angelfish to the gods.
Koror (to October 7, 2006): Etymology uncertain. Formerly spelt Coror, Corror, or Corrora.

Panama:

Panama City: After a former village near the modern capital, Panama City. From the Cueva Indian language meaning "place of abundance of fish" or "place of many fish", possibly from the Caribe "abundance of butterflies", or possibly from another native term referring to the Panama tree.
Darien (1510–1521): A masculine given name related to the Persian name Darius, meaning "king".

Papua New Guinea:

Port Moresby: It was first sighted by a European in 1873 by Captain John Moresby. It was named in honour of his father Admiral Sir Fairfax Moresby.

Paraguay:

Asunción: "Assumption" in Spanish.
Piribebuy (January 1, 1869 – August 12, 1869): In the Guarani language Piri vevui means chilliness or smooth breeze, and pirivevúi, lightweight reed. Pirĩvevuĩ is a "soft feeling that is experienced within the area, the presence of fresh streams". However, the "light reed" etymology is more plausible, because the Paraguay River, at its mouth from the Piribebuy to a few miles north of Asunción, in a place called Arecutacuá, has formed a landscape dominated by this vegetation type, and in addition Guarani placenames were always based on the place's distinguishing natural characteristics.

Peru:

Lima: According to early Spanish chronicles the Lima area was once called Ichma, after its original inhabitants. However, even before the Inca occupation of the area in the 15th century, a famous oracle in the Rímac Valley had come to be known by visitors as Limaq (limaq, pronounced [ˈlimɑq], which means "talker" in coastal Quechua). This oracle was eventually destroyed by the Spanish and replaced with a church, but the name persisted in the local language, thus the chronicles show "Límac" replacing "Ychma" as the common name for the area. Modern scholars speculate that the word "Lima" originated as the Spanish pronunciation of the native name Limaq. Linguistic evidence seems to support this theory as spoken Spanish consistently rejects stop consonants in word-final position. The city was founded in 1535 under the name City of the Kings (Spanish: Ciudad de los Reyes) because its foundation was decided on January 6, date of the feast of the Epiphany. Nevertheless, this name quickly fell into disuse and Lima became the city's name of choice; on the oldest Spanish maps of Peru, both Lima and Ciudad de los Reyes can be seen together as names for the city.
It is worth noting that the river that feeds Lima is called Rímac, and many people erroneously assume that this is because its original Inca name is "Talking River" (the Incas spoke a highland variety of Quechua where the word for "talker" was pronounced [ˈrimɑq]). However, the original inhabitants of the valley were not the Incas, and this name is actually an innovation arising from an effort by the Cuzco nobility in colonial times to standardize the toponym so that it would conform to the phonology of Cuzco Quechua. Later, as the original inhabitants of the valley died out and the local Quechua became extinct, the Cuzco pronunciation prevailed. In modern times, Spanish-speaking locals do not see the connection between the name of their city and the name of the river that runs through it. They often assume that the valley is named after the river; however, Spanish documents from the colonial period show the opposite to be true.
Jauja (April 1534 – January 1535): Derived from its native name Hatun Xauxa.
Tacna (Capital of Peru–Bolivia 1836–1839): Derived from the Quechua words "taka" ("hit") and "na" ("something to do") so "Tacna" probably means "a place to hit".

Philippines:

Manila: evolved Spanish form of the Tagalog phrase may-nilà ("where there is indigo"), which remains the native name for the city to this day. The name is more likely in reference to the presence of indigo-yielding plants growing in the area surrounding the settlement, rather than a reference to the settlement being known for trading in indigo dye (Tagalog: nilà, derived from the Sanskrit nīla (नील), Maynilà was founded several hundred years before indigo dye extraction became an important economic activity in the Manila area in the 18th century.
Quezon City (1948–1976): named after Manuel L. Quezon, the former president of the Commonwealth of the Philippines, during whose term the city was established and began to be developed to replace Manila as the country's capital.
Cebu City (1565–1571): Spanish corruption of the Cebuano word sugbu ("to walk on shallow waters"), referring to the fact that the settlement was fronted by a shallow tidal plain through which one had to wade to board seagoing vessels anchored in deeper waters, or to reach dry land after disembarking. Earlier Hispanicized variants of the settlement's name include Zubu and Çubu.

Poland:

Warsaw: "Belonging to Warsz"
Lublin (de facto 1944–1945): In the early historical sources from 1228 the modern form of the name appears. It comes from a personal name formed from the name Lubla Lubomir, by adding a suffix formerly pieszczotliwego-la. It is also possible that the name Lubla in its traditional Polish diminutive form united with possessive suffix-in, giving the name of Lublin. Zygmunt Sułowski expressed belief that the name of Lublin combines the word Lubel (Lubelnia), in analogy to the related name Wróblin, sparrow. The founder and owner of Lublin in ancient times could thus be a man by the name of Lubel, or Lubla.
Kraków (1038–1079 and 1296–1596): "Belonging to Krakus."
Poznań (964–1038 and 1290–1296): The name Poznań probably comes from a personal name Poznan (from the Polish participle poznan(y) – "one who is known/recognized") and would mean "Poznan's town". It is also possible that the name comes directly from the verb poznać, which means "to get to know" or "to recognize".
The earliest surviving references to the city are found in the chronicles of Thietmar of Merseburg, written between 1012 and 1018: episcopus Posnaniensis ("bishop of Poznań", in an entry for 970) and ab urbe Posnani ("from the city of Poznań", for 1005). The city's name appears in documents in the Latin nominative case as Posnania in 1236 and Poznania in 1247. The phrase in Poznan appears in 1146 and 1244.
The city's full official name is Stołeczne Miasto Poznań ("The Capital City of Poznań"), in reference to its role as a centre of political power in the early Polish state. Poznań is known as Posen in German, and was officially called Haupt- und Residenzstadt Posen ("Capital and Residence City of Poznań") between 20 August 1910 and 28 November 1918. The Latin names of the city are Posnania and Civitas Posnaniensis. Its Yiddish name is פּױזן, or Poyzn.
The Russian version of the name, Познань (Poznan'), is of feminine gender, in contrast to the Polish name, which is masculine.
Płock (1080–1138): Believed to have derived from the Polish word "płotu" meaning "fence".
Gniezno (964–1038): Derived from "Gniazdo", the Polish word for "nest".

Portugal:

Lisbon: There are many theories describing the etymology of Lisbon: 1. The name derives from Tartessian ‘Olissipo’ 2. The name is derived from the Phoenician phrase 𐤑𐤇𐤋𐤋𐤀 𐤏𐤁𐤁𐤅 meaning "Safe Harbor." 3. The name is derived from the name of the Pre-Roman river "Lissa" or "lucio." 4. The city was founded by the Greek hero Ulysses and he named the city Ολισσιπόνα "Olissipona." ("City of Ulysses") Ptolemy called the city of "Oliosipon. The Visigoths called it "Ulishbona" and the Moors called it in Arabic, الي لشبونة "al-Ushbuna". In early Galician-Portuguese the name ‘’Lisboa’’ replaced the medieval version “Lissabona".
Coimbra (1139–1255): Derived from the Conimbriga. The name Conimbriga derives from an early, possibly pre-Indo-European element meaning "rocky height or outcrop" and the Celtic briga, signifying a defended place. Others think that the element coni may be related to the Conii people.
Guimarães (1095–1139): Named after Vímara Peres (Vimaranis, later Guimaranis).

== Q ==
Qatar:

Doha: From Arabic الدوحة, ad-Dawḥa or ad-Dōḥa, meaning "The Sticky Tree".

== R ==
Romania:

Bucharest: Tradition connects the founding of Bucharest with the name of Bucur who was either a prince, an outlaw, a fisherman, a shepherd, or a hunter, according to different legends. In Romanian the word stem bucur means 'glad', 'joy', in Albanian, a language which may have historical connections with the Thracian languages, 'bukur' signifies 'beautiful' and 'esht' signifies 'is', literally translated as 'it is beautiful'.
Iaşi (1859–1862 and December 1916 – December 1918): Scholars have different theories on the origin of the name "Iaşi". Some argue that the name originates with the Sarmatian tribe Iazyges (of Iranian origin), one mentioned by Ovid as "Ipse vides onerata ferox ut ducata Iasyx/ Per media Istri plaustra bubulcus aquas" and "Iazyges et Colchi Metereaque turba Getaque/ Danubii mediis vix prohibentur aquis".

A now lost inscription on a Roman milestone found near Osijek, Croatia by Matija Petar Katančić in the 18th century, mentions the existence of a Jassiorum municipium, or Municipium Dacorum-Iassiorum from other sources.

Another explanation is that the name originated from the Iranian Alanic tribe of Jassi. The Hungarian name of the city (Jászvásár) literally means "Jassic Market"; the antiquated Romanian name, Târgul Ieşilor (and the once-favoured Iaşii), may indicate the same meaning.

Oral sources say that the name may come from an archaic form of the Romanian word "to exit" because the city was an important trade node in the region.

Russia:

Moscow: The city is named after the river (old гра́д Моско́в, literally "the city by the Moskva River"). The origin of the name is unknown, although several theories exist. One theory suggests that the source of the name is an ancient Finnic language, in which it means "dark" and "turbid". Alternatively, the name may come from the Mordvinian language, meaning "bear-river". Another claim is that the word is a changed version of the Mongolian word "mushka", which means tangled or angled in reference to the tangled and angled setup of the Moscow River that much of the city is nearby. The first Russian reference to Moscow dates from 1147 when Yuri Dolgorukiy called upon the prince of the Novgorod-Severski to "come to me, brother, to Moscow."
Saint Petersburg: Named after Saint Peter.

Rwanda:

Kigali from Mount Kigali, whose name in turn combines the Kinyarwanda indicator prefix ki- with the adjective suffix -gali, meaning "wide" or "broad".

== S ==
Saint Kitts and Nevis:

Basseterre: "Low Land" in French.
Old Road (1623–1727)

Saint Lucia:

Castries: Castries was founded by the French in 1650 as Carenage (meaning safe anchorage), then renamed in 1756 after Charles Eugène Gabriel de La Croix, marquis de Castries, commander of a French expeditionary force to Corsica that year.

Saint Vincent and the Grenadines:

Kingstown: "King's Town".

Samoa:

Apia

San Marino:

San Marino: Named in honor of Saint Marinus.

São Tomé and Príncipe:

São Tomé: "Saint Thomas" in Portuguese.
Santo António (1753–1852): "Saint Anthony" in Portuguese.

Saudi Arabia:

Riyadh: The city's name is derived from the Arabic word رياض riyadh, which means "gardens", plural of "rawdha" روضة. particularly those formed in the desert after rains.
Jiddah: There are at least two explanations for the etymology of the name Jeddah, according to Jeddah Ibn Helwaan Al-Qudaa'iy, the chief of the Quda'a clan. The more common account has it that the name is derived from جده Jaddah, the Arabic word for "grandmother". According to eastern folk belief, the tomb of Eve (21°29′31″N 39°11′24″E), considered the grandmother of humanity, is located in Jeddah. The tomb was sealed with concrete by the religious authorities in 1975 as a result of some Muslims praying at the site.
Ibn Battuta, the Berber traveller, visited Jeddah during his world trip. He wrote the name of the city into his diary as "Juddah".
The British Foreign Office and other branches of the British government used to use the older spelling of "Jedda", contrary to other English-speaking usage, but in 2007 changed to the spelling "Jeddah".
T. E. Lawrence felt that any transcription of Arabic names into English was arbitrary. In his book Revolt in the Desert, Jeddah is spelled three different ways on the first page alone.
On official Saudi maps and documents, the city name is transcribed "Jeddah", which is now the prevailing usage.

Senegal:

Dakar: The name appeared as Dakar for the first time on a map in 1750 when French botanist Michel Adanson made a sketch of Cape Vert. Dakar could be a Frenchified version of ndakarou, the local name, whose etymology remains uncertain, perhaps derived from the Wolof phrase deuk raw, meaning "who settled there will be peace" or raw-Dekker, an association of Dekker (country) and raw (escape). It could also be from the Wolof term dakhar, which means "tamarind".
The town is mentioned in some documents under the name of "Accard", a reference to a Frenchman of the late 17th century named Accar or Accard.
Saint Louis (1959–1809, 1817–1904, and 1817 – January 8, 1958)
Freetown (1809–1817; now in Sierra Leone)

Serbia:

Belgrade (1817–1818, 1283–1430, and 1915–present): From Serbian Београд Beograd meaning "White City".
Kragujevac (1818–1841 and 1914–1915): The name of the town derived from the archaic Serbian word Крагуј kraguj, which is a name used for a hunting hawk, thus the name means "hawk's nesting place". Old maps show the name as Krakow.
Smederevo (1430–1453): Derived from Serbian Смедереву meaning "Brown Revue".

Seychelles:

Victoria: "Victory" in Latin.
Établissement (1778–1814): "Establishment" in French.
Mahé (1770–1778): The island was named after Bertrand-François Mahé de La Bourdonnais, a French governor of Mauritius.

Sierra Leone:

Freetown: Known as Granville Town (named in honor of English abolitionist Granville Sharp) from 1787 to 1789 and again from 1791 to 1792.

Singapore:

Singapore (1837–1946; still the capital today): Derived from Sanskrit सिंहपुरं Simhapuram meaning "Lion City". Compound of Sanskrit: सिंह(siṃhá, "lion") and पुर(pura, "city").
Penang (1826–1837; now in Malaysia): Derived from the Malay name Pulau Pinang which means "island of the areca nut palm". (Areca catechu)

Slovakia:

Bratislava: Named in honor of Prince Bräslav. Bratislava literally means "Braslav's Glory". The city was known as Pozsony when it served as the capital of Hungary from 1536 to 1848. The name is derived from the Hungarian personal name Poson.

Slovenia:

Ljubljana: The origin of the city's name is unclear. In the Middle Ages, both the river and the town were also known by the German name Laibach, which was in official use until 1918. For most scholars, the problem has been in how to connect the Slovene and the German names. A common folk etymology has traditionally connected the name to the Slovene word ljubljena 'beloved'. The origin from the Slavic -ljub 'to love, like' was in 2007 supported as the most probable by the linguist Tijmen Pronk, a specialist in comparative Indo-European linguistics and Slovene dialectology from the University of Leiden. He supports the thesis that the name of the river derived from the name of the settlement. The linguist Silvo Torkar, who specialises in Slovene personal and place names, argued at the same place for the thesis that the name Ljubljana derives from Ljubija, the original name of the Ljubljanica River flowing through it, itself derived from the Old Slavic male name Ljubovid, "the one of a kind appearance". The name Laibach, he claimed, was a hybrid of German and Slovene and also derived from the same personal name.
Kranj (?–1335): Probably derived the Slavic root word "krai" meaning "on the edge".

Solomon Islands:

Honiara: From Nagoniara, the original name of the area in the northern Guadalcanal languages, meaning "in front of the wind".
Tulagi (1893–1952): Etymology uncertain.

Somalia:

Mogadishu: The name "Mogadishu" is held to be derived from the Arabic ماقد شاه Maq'ad Shah ("The seat of the Shah"), a reflection of the city's early Persian influence. The city went by its Italian name Mogadiscio from 1889 to 1960.

South Africa:

Pretoria (administrative capital): Named in honor of the Voortrekker leader Andries Pretorius, the father of the founder of city Marthinus Pretorius.
Cape Town (legislative capital): Named because of its location on the Cape of Good Hope.
Bloemfontein (judicial capital): "spring of Bloem (bloom)", "flower spring" or "fountain of flowers" in Dutch. The city's Sesotho name is Mangaung, meaning "place of cheetahs."

South Korea: see K on this page

South Sudan:

Juba: The name is derived from Djouba, another name for the Bari people.

Spain:

Madrid (1561–1600): There are several theories regarding the origin of the name "Madrid". According to legend Madrid was founded by Ocno Bianor (son of King Tyrrhenius of Tuscany and Mantua) and was named "Metragirta" or "Mantua Carpetana". Others contend that the original name of the city was "Ursaria" ("land of bears" in Latin), due to the high number of these animals that were found in the adjacent forests, which, together with the strawberry tree ("madroño" in Spanish), have been the emblem of the city from the Middle Ages. The ancient name of the city Magerit comes from the name of a fortress built on the Manzanares River in 9AD, and means "Place of abundant water".
Nevertheless, it is now commonly believed that the origin of the current name of the city comes from the 2nd century BC. The Roman Empire established a settlement on the banks of the Manzanares river. The name of this first village was "Matrice" (a reference to the river that crossed the settlement). Following the invasions of the Germanic Sueves, Vandals and Alans during the 5th century AD, the Roman Empire could not defend its territories on the Iberian Peninsula, and were therefore overrun by the Visigoths. The barbarian tribes subsequently took control of "Matrice". In the 7th century the Islamic conquest of the Iberian Peninsula saw the name changed to "Mayrit", from the Arabic term ميرا "Mayra" (referencing water as a "trees" or "giver of life") and the Ibero-Roman suffix "it" that means "place". The modern "Madrid" evolved from the Mozarabic Matrit, which is still in the Madrilenian gentilic. Around this palace a small citadel, al-Mudaina, was built. Near that palace was the Manzanares, which the Muslims called al-Majrīṭ (Arabic: المجريط, "source of water"). From this came the naming of the site as Majerit, which later evolved into the modern-day spelling of Madrid.
Toledo (1479 – May 1561): It was first written as Toletum in the work of Roman historian Livy, where Tollitum/Toletum would originate, which would become Tollitu, Tollito, Tollet, Tolledo and finally Toledo. Its meaning would be "up, up." Martin Gallego contains the version of "double turns or bend of the river that encircles". The writer of the twelfth century, Ab-Din Abu al – Ayyubid, says طليطلة Tulaytulah means "happy", without giving an explanation.
Valladolid (1600–1604): One suggestion for the origin of Valladolid's name comes from its apparent similarity with "BaladulWalid" (in Arabic بلد الوليد) meaning The City of Walid, in memory of one of the Umayyad dynasty's greatest caliphs in Damascus; but no good reason has been given as to why the Moors should have given such a grand title to what was then a remote village on the much contested frontier of their empire. A more likely suggestion is a conjunction of the Latin vallis, "Valley", and Celtic tolitum, "place of confluence of waters". Ruins of a Roman settlement have been found in the area and the area was occupied by Celtic tribes when it was conquered by the Romans. Another suggestion is valla ("fence" in Spanish) "de" (of) Olid (Spanish family name).
It is also popularly called Pucela, a nickname whose origin is not clear, but probably refers to a few knights who accompanied Joan of Arc. Another theory tells that it was called Pucela because Pozzolana cement was sold there, the only city in Spain that did.
Valencia (November 1936 – October 1937): The original Latin name of the city was Valentia (Classical Latin: [waˈlɛntɪ.a]), meaning "strength", "valour", the city being named for the Roman practice of recognizing the valour of former Roman soldiers after a war. The Roman historian Titus Livius (Livy) explains that the founding of Valentia in the 2nd century BC was due to the settling of the Roman soldiers who fought against local Iberian rebel Viriatus.
During the rule of the Muslim Empires in Spain, it was known as بلنسية (Balansiya) in Arabic. By regular sound changes, this has become Valencia [baˈlenθja] in Spanish and València [vaˈlensia] in Valencian.
Barcelona (October 1937–1939): The name Barcelona comes from the ancient Iberian Barkeno, attested in an ancient coin inscription in Iberian script as, in Greek sources as Varkinòn, Βαρκινών; and in Latin as Barcino, Barcelo and Barceno.

During the Middle Ages, the city was variously known as Barchinona, Barçalona, Barchelona, and Barchenona. Some sources say that the city could have been named after the Carthaginian general Hamilcar Barca, who supposedly founded the city in 3 BC.

Burgos (July 1936 – October 1939): There are several versions of its etymology. Most derive it from Low Latin Burgus, Greek Πύργος pyrgos, which mean "tower" and would refer to the two towers built on the hill del Castillo. Others believe it comes from the German Berg, mountain. Vegetius states that Bergus, Burgus, means small castle. Guadix adds that the Arabic بورجوا burgo, "thatched house, borough" means that the name could have been taken from the Goths.

Sri Lanka:

Colombo: The name "Colombo", first introduced by the Portuguese in 1505, is believed to be derived from the classical Sinhalese name ඛොලන් ථොට Kolon thota, meaning "port on the river Kelani". It has also been suggested that the name may be derived from the Sinhalese name ඛොල-අම්බ-තොට Kola-amba-thota which means "Harbour with leafy mango trees". However, it is also possible that the Portuguese named the city after Christopher Columbus, the sailor who lived in Portugal for many years before finding the Americas on behalf of the Spanish monarchs Ferdinand II of Aragon and Isabella I of Castile. His Portuguese name is Cristóvão Colombo. Columbus set sail to look for India westwards around the same time Portuguese sailor Vasco da Gama set sail eastwards, landing at the Port of Calicut in India on 20 May 1498. Columbus came to the Caribbean six years before that on 12 October 1492 and was already a famed sailor and explorer, celebrated both in Portugal and Spain by the time Dom Lourenço de Almeida accidentally landed in the port of Galle in 1505.

Sri Jayewardenepura Kotte (Legislative capital since April 29, 1982): "Resplendent City of Growing Victory" The ancient name, Jayawardenepura, is hardly different from the city's present name. Though during those times, it referred to the area outside the inner moat called Pitakotte (outer fort) and the area inside, Ethul Kotte (inner fort). The word Kotte is derived from the Tamil word கொட்டெஇ Kottei (fortress). Jayawardhanapura (ජයවර්ධනපුර) meaning "victory enhancing city" in Sinhala, was the name assigned to the place by its founder Alagakkonara.

Sudan:

Khartoum: The word 'Khartoum' is derived from Arabic Al-Jartūm الخرطوم meaning "end of an elephant's trunk", probably referring to the narrow strip of land extending between the Blue and White Niles. Captain J. A. Grant, who reached Khartoum in 1863 with Captain Speke's expedition, thought that the derivation was most probably from the safflower (Carthamus tinctorius L.) which is called 'Gartoon,' and which was cultivated extensively in Egypt for its oil, used in burning.
Omdurman (1881–1898): Omdurman was originally known as Wen-Dhurman in the Dinka language. The phrase 'Wen-Dhurman' means "Son Mourning his Mother." This is so because history has it that a mother of Deng Abuk, the legendary ancestry of the Dinka tribe, drowned when they were crossing the River Nile while migrating southwards. But her eldest son could not accept this tragedy, and thus remained on the river crying for days, until passers-by found him. When asked why he was crying, he responded that he was mourning his mum; and hence this became the name of that place.

Suriname:

Paramaribo: Named after the Carib tribe Parmirbo.

Sweden:

Stockholm (1419–present): "Log Islet" in Swedish.
Uppsala (ca 900–present): "Upper halls" in Swedish.

Switzerland:

Bern (1803–present): Duke Berchtold V of Zähringen founded the city on the River Aare in 1191 and allegedly named it after a bear (Bär in German) he had killed.
Aarau (May–October 1798): Named after the Aar River which runs through the city, with the German word Au, meaning "floodplain".
Lucerne (October 1798–1803): From French luzerne ("lamp"), because of its bright seeds.

Syria:

Damascus: From Latin Damascus, which was imported from Ancient Greek Δαμασκός (Damaskos), which originated in Aramaic דרמשק (darmeśeq, "well-watered place").

== T ==
Taiwan (Republic of China):

Taipei: From Chinese 臺北, meaning "Northern Taiwan."

Tajikistan:

Dushanbe: From Persian and Tajik Душанбе, meaning "Monday."

Tanzania:

Dar es Salaam (1891–present): From Arabic دار السلام, meaning "House of Peace."
Bagamoyo (1885–1891): In the late 18th century, Muslim families settled in Bagamoyo, all of which were relatives of Shamvi la Magimba in Oman. They made their living by enforcing taxes on the native population and by trading in salt, gathered from the Nunge coast north of Bagamoyo. In the first half of the 19th century, Bagamoyo became a trading port for ivory and the slave trade, with traders coming from the African interior, from places as far as Morogoro, Lake Tanganyika and Usambara on their way to Zanzibar. This explains the meaning of the word Bagamoyo ("Bwaga-Moyo") which means "Lay down your Heart" in Swahili. It is disputed whether this refers to the slave trade which passed through the town (i.e. "give up all hope") or to the porters who rested in Bagamoyo after carrying 35lb cargos on their shoulders from the Great Lakes region (i.e. "take the load off and rest"). Since there is little evidence to support that Bagamoyo was a major slave port (Kilwa, much further south, has earned this status), and that tens of thousands of porters arrived at Bagamoyo annually in the latter half of the 19th century, it is more likely that the name of the town derives from the latter interpretation.
Dodoma (Legislative capital since February 1996): "It has sunk" in Gogo.

Thailand:

Bangkok: It is believed that "Bangkok" derived from either Bang Kok, kok (กอก) being the Thai name for the Java plum (ma-kok, มะกอก), one of several trees bearing olive-like fruits; or Bang Koh, koh meaning "island", a reference to the area's landscape which was carved by rivers and canals. The city's Thai name กรุงเทพฯ Krung Thep means "City of the Deity."
Sukhothai (1250–1350 or 1250–1371): From Thai สุโขทัย, meaning "Dawn of Happiness."
Ayutthaya (1350–1463 and 1488–1767): The name Ayutthaya derives from the Ayodhya of the Ramayana epic.
Phitsanulok (1463–1488; 1371–1378): From Thai พิษณุโลก, meaning "Vishnu's Heaven."
Thonburi (October 1767–1782): From Thai ธนบุรี, meaning "Bank Town".

Togo:

Lomé (1897–present): Lomé comes from Alotimé which in Ewe means "among the alo plants" (the Alo is a tree whose trunk is still the main source of toothpicks in South Togo). The hunter Dzitri, who founded the city, established himself among the trees, which at the time dominated the site.
Sebe or Aného (1886–1897)
Bagid (1884–1886)

Tonga:

Nuku'alofa (1799–1812, 1845–1847, and 1851–present): "Residence and Love" in Tongan.
Lifuka (1812–1845 and 1847–1851)

Trinidad and Tobago:

Port-of-Spain

Tunisia:

Tunis: The name possibly derives from either the Phoenician goddess Tanith, the ancient city of Tynes or the Berber root word ens, which means "to lie down".

Turkey:

Ankara (1920–present): Derived from Ἄγκυρα (Ánkyra, meaning Anchor) in Greek.
Constantinople (1453–1920): Named after the Roman Emperor Constantine I. The modern name Istanbul is derived from the Greek phrase "εἰς τὴν Πόλιν" [is tin ˈpolin] or in the Aegean dialect "εἰς τὰν Πόλιν" [is tan ˈpolin] (modern Greek "στην Πόλη" [stin ˈpoli]), which means "in the city", "to the city" or "downtown". To this day, Greeks often refer to Istanbul as 'tin Poli' (the City). A version found in Western languages, Stamboul, was used in lieu of Istanbul until the creation of the modern Turkish language by Atatürk after 1932. Before that time, English-speaking sources used Stamboul to describe the central parts on the historic peninsula between the Golden Horn and the Sea of Marmara.
Adrianople (1365–1453): The city was founded as Hadrianopolis (Ἁδριανούπολις), named for the Roman Emperor Hadrian. This name is still used in the Modern Greek (Αδριανούπολη). The name Adrianople was used in English, until the Turkish adoption of the Latin alphabet in 1928 made Edirne the internationally recognized name. The Turkish Edirne, the Bulgarian Одрин (Odrin), and the Serbian Једрене (Jedrene) are adapted forms of the name Hadrianopolis.
Bursa (1335–1365): Derived from the Latin word "bursa", meaning "purse."

Turkmenistan:

Ashgabat (1918–1919; 1927–present): Ashgabat is Aşgabat in Turkmen, Ашхабад (Ashkhabad) in Russian, and عشق‌آباد (UniPers: Ešq-âbâd) in Persian. From 1919 until 1927, the city was renamed Poltoratsk after a local revolutionary. Before 1991, the city was usually spelled Ashkhabad in English, a transliteration of the Russian form, which was itself from the original Persian form. It has also been variously spelled Ashkhabat and Ashgabad.
Ashgabat derives from a folk etymology suggesting that the name is a dialect version of the Persian word of عشق (eshq meaning "love") and Persian آباد (ābād meaning "inhabited place" or "city", etymologically "abode"), and hence loosely translates as "the city of love" or "the city that love built".
Merv (1855–1881): From Persian مرو (Marv, "ready").

Tuvalu:

Funafuti: As was the case with Vaitupu, the founding ancestors were Telematua and his two wives Futi (meaning banana) and Tupu (meaning "holy" or "abundant"). The Futi part of the name means "banana" and funa is a feminine prefix.

== U ==
Uganda:

Kampala (1890–1905; 1958–present): Derived from Impala, which means "gazelle" in a number of Ugandan Bantu languages, including Luganda which is spoken by the Ganda people whose kingdom included all the area on which the whole Kampala metropolitan area sits.

Entebbe (1905–1958): "A Seat" in Luganda.

Ukraine:

Kyiv: From Ukrainian Київ, meaning "Belonging to Kyi."

United Arab Emirates:

Abu Dhabi: From Arabic أبو ظبي Abū ẓabī, meaning "Father of Gazelle".

United Kingdom:

London: See Etymology of London.

United States of America:

Washington, D.C. (1800–present): Named after George Washington. The D.C. Stands for District of Columbia, which was named in honor of Christopher Columbus.
Philadelphia (1774–1776, 1778–1783, and 1790–1800): From Greek Φιλαδέλφεια, meaning "Brotherly Love" in Greek. A compound of φίλος (philos, love), and ἀδελφός (adelphos, brother).
New York City (1785–1790): See "York, Pennsylvania" below.
Trenton, New Jersey (1784): Named after William Trent.
Annapolis, Maryland (1783–1784): From Greek Αννάπολις, meaning "City of Grace" in Greek, but named after Anne, Queen of Great Britain.
Princeton, New Jersey (1783): "Prince Town probably after William, Prince of Orange".
York, Pennsylvania (1777–1778): Named after the city of York, United Kingdom. The word 'York' is derived from the Latin name for the British city, variously rendered as Eboracum, Eburacum or Eburaci. The first mention of York by this name is dated to c. 95–104 AD as an address on a wooden stylus tablet from the Roman fortress of Vindolanda in Northumberland. The toponymy of Eboracum is uncertain because the language of the pre-Roman indigenous population of the area was never recorded. These people are thought to have spoken a Celtic language, related to modern Welsh. Therefore, it is thought that Eboracum is derived from the Brythonic word Eborakon, meaning either "place of the yew trees" (cf. efrog in Welsh, eabhrac in Irish Gaelic and eabhraig in Scottish Gaelic, by which names the city is known in those languages) or perhaps "field of Eboras". The name Eboracum was turned into Eoforwic by the Anglians in the 7th century. This was probably by a conflation of ebor with a Germanic root *eburaz (boar); by the 7th century the Old English for boar had become eofor, and Eboracum Eoforwic. The wic simply signified 'place'. When the Danish army conquered the city in 866, the name became rendered as Jórvík. This was gradually reduced to York in the centuries following the Norman Conquest, moving from the Middle English Yerk through to Yourke in the 16th century and then Yarke in the 17th century. The form York was first recorded in the 13th century.
Baltimore, Maryland (1776–1777): The city is named after Lord Baltimore in the Irish House of Lords, the founding proprietor of the Maryland Colony. Baltimore himself took his title from a place in Bornacoola parish, County Leitrim and County Longford, Ireland. Baltimore is an anglicized form of the Irish Baile an Tí Mhóir, meaning "Town of the Big House", not to be confused with Baltimore, County Cork, the Irish name of which is Dún na Séad.
Lancaster, Pennsylvania (1777): named after Lancaster in UK – Loncastre (1086) "Roman Fort on the River Lune", a Celtic river name probably meaning "healthy, pure." The Lancastrians in the War of the Roses took their name from their descent from John of Gaunt, Duke of Lancaster.

Uruguay:

Montevideo: It is not in dispute that Monte comes from the hill which faces the bay, the Cerro de Montevideo, but there are at least two explanations of the origin of the name Montevideo:
- The first says that the name comes from the words in Portuguese "Monte vide eu", meaning 'I saw a mountain', a phrase uttered by a seaman on the expedition of Ferdinand Magellan when he saw the hill of Montevideo; this comes from the boatswain, Francisco Albo, referring in his journal to "a mountain like a hat which we named Montevidi", but the origin in the seaman's exclamation is not mentioned there and would require a strange mixing of dialects.
- The second says that the Spanish recorded the location on a map as the sixth hill going from east to west (Monte VI De Este o Oeste). There is no conclusive evidence for this.
- A third, less popular theory is that it derives from a religious name, Ovid Monte (Monte Santo Ovidio). Ovidio or Ovid was the third bishop of the Portuguese city of Braga and was revered; a monument was erected to him in 1505. Albo's account mentions a corruption of the name into Santo Vidio. There is no evidence for this etymology, but it is attractive enough that it has appeared on some maps of the region.

Uzbekistan:

Tashkent: Derived from Uzbek Toshkent, meaning "Stone City". Tash means "stone" in Turkic languages and is derived from Proto-Turkic *tiāĺ (reconstructed form). Kent means "city" in Turkic languages.

== V ==
Vanuatu:

Port-Vila: "Vila" means "Town" in Portuguese, hence "Port Vila" means "Port Town".

Venezuela:

Caracas: Named after an indigenous tribe of the same name.

Vietnam:

Hanoi (1010–1802; 1945–present): Derived from Vietnamese Hà Nội (河内) meaning "Between Rivers" or "River Interior" in Vietnamese.
Saigon (capital of South Vietnam): See Ho Chi Minh City#Etymology.
Phong Châu (2809–258 BC): Derived from Vietnamese phộng meaning "peanut." Phong can also mean "style". Châu is derived from Chinese 周 zhōu meaning "Week" or "Circumference".
Cổ Loa: Its name is derived from the Sino-Vietnamese 古螺, meaning "old spiral".
Tô Lịch (257–111 BC and 939–965 AD): "Calendar" in Vietnamese.
Hoa Lư (968–980 AD): "Black Flower".
La Thành (980–1010): "The City" in Vietnamese.
Huế (1842–1945): Derived from 花 hoa meaning "flower".

== Y ==
Yemen

Sana'a: Probably meaning "well fortified".

== Z ==
Zambia

Lusaka: Named in honor of Lusakasa.
Livingstone (1911–1935): Named after David Livingstone.
Fort James (1899–1911)
Salisbury (1894–1899): Named after Salisbury, United Kingdom.
Lealui (1899–1911): Luyi is derived from Siluyana root-word uyi meaning bad or cruel. The claim by some scholars that in the Nkoya language luyi means foreigner, might be an indication of the phenomenon of borrowed words assuming new meanings, while claims that it is the Nkoya or Kwengo who so named the Aluyi are misleading.

Zimbabwe

Harare: Derived from either the Shona chieftain Neharawa or from the European corruption of "Haarari" ("He does not sleep"). Known as Salisbury from 1897 to 1981 and Fort Salisbury from September 12, 1890 to 1897.
Matabeleland–Bulawayo (1881–1890): Matabeleland means "Land of the Ndebele People." Ndebele literally means "Refugees", thus Matabeleland literally means "Land of the Refugees". The name Bulawayo comes from the Sindebele word KwaBulawayo, meaning "a place where he is being killed". It is thought that at the time of the formation of the city, there was a civil war and a group of Ndebeles not aligned with Prince Lobengula were fighting him as they felt he was not the heir to the throne, hence he gave his capital the name 'where he (the prince) is being killed'. Some historians differ on this matter, describing Bulawayo as 'at the place of He who Kills' or 'place of slaughter'.
The name Bulawayo is imported from Nguniland, which is a place once occupied by the Khumalo people. The place still exists and is next to Richards Bay.

== Sources ==
- http://www.Worldstatesmen.org
- http://www.wiktionary.org
- http://www.etymonline.com
