= Beaches of Lomé =

Coastline of the capital of Togo

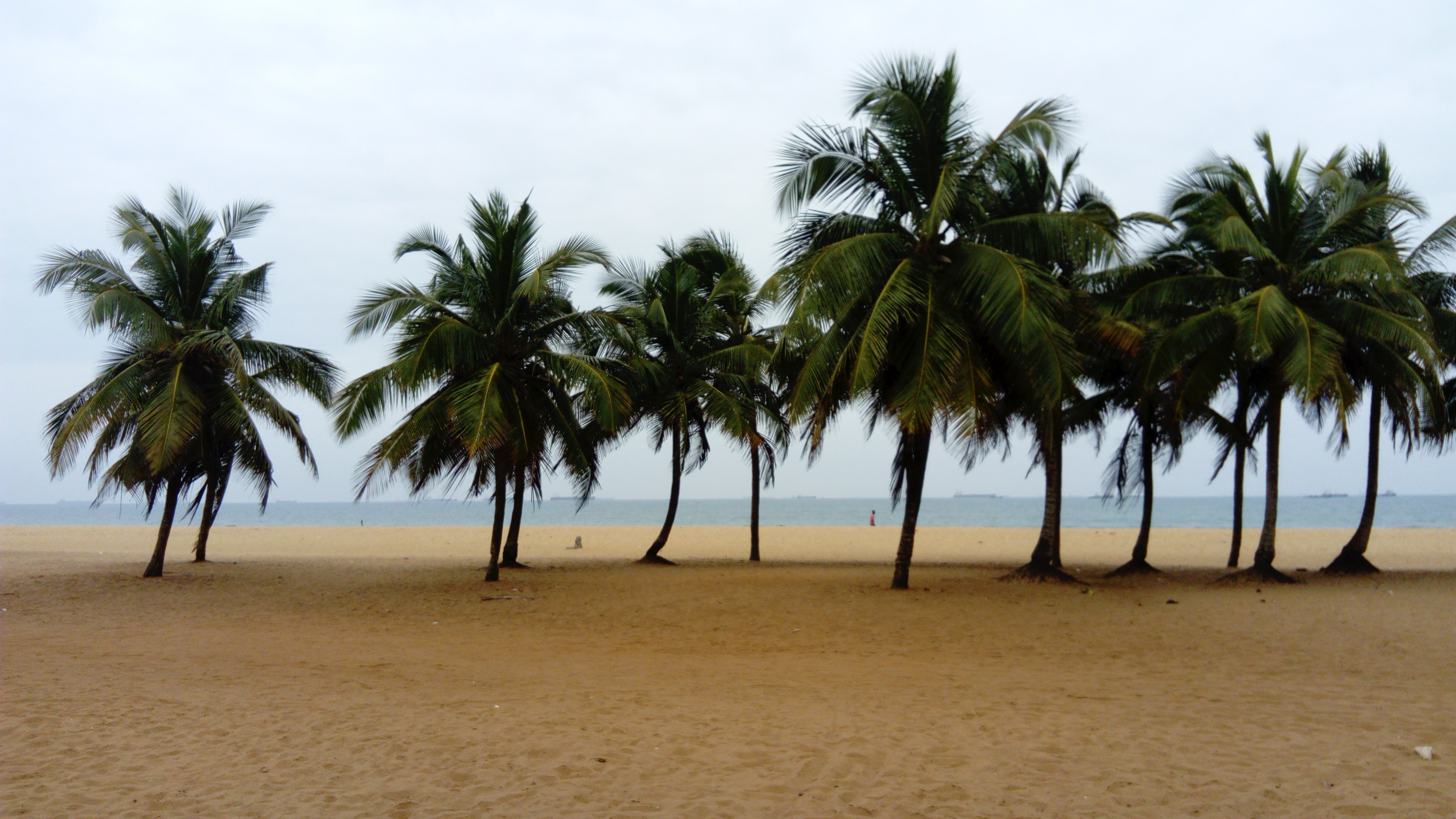
A beach in Lomé

The beaches of Lomé form the sandy coastline of Lomé, the capital of Togo, on the Gulf of Guinea. East of the port, the coast continues towards Baguida, Kpémé and Aného. The beaches serve as a recreational area, a base for small-scale fishing and a historic site.

== Use ==
Because Lomé has few parks and green spaces, its beaches are among the city's main public gathering places. Thousands of visitors come, especially on Sunday afternoons and religious holidays, and street vendors and photographers work along the shore. Beach football, beach volleyball, surfing and kitesurfing are also practised.

Strong currents make swimming far from the shore dangerous.

== Environment and coastal erosion ==
The Togolese coast is severely affected by coastal erosion. Since 2018, Togo has taken part in the World Bank-funded regional West Africa Coastal Areas (WACA) programme, which finances coastal defences at Agbodrafo and Aného among other works. By 2025, 60% of the coastline was protected, up from 44% in 2020, through some 18 km of dykes, riprap and groynes.

Two species of sea turtle nest on the Togolese coast: the olive ridley sea turtle and the leatherback sea turtle. They lay their eggs from July to September, notably on the beaches of Baguida and Kpémé.

== Lomé wharf ==
During the German colonial period, a 160-metre (520 ft) wooden pier was built in 1899–1900; it was destroyed by waves in April 1900. A 304-metre (997 ft) metal wharf followed between 1901 and 1904, allowing goods and passengers to be transferred between ships and the shore. It was extended in 1908–1909 and fell out of use after the deep-water port opened in 1964. Its ruins are still visible on the beach at Kodjoviakopé, opposite the Boulevard de la Marina.
