= Torkar =

Torkar is a surname. Notable people with the surname include:

- Igor Torkar (1913–2004), pen name of Boris Fakin, Slovene writer
- Isidor Torkar (born 1960), Swedish actor from Slovenia
- Silvo Torkar (born 1954), Slovene linguist

== See also ==
- Torkan (surname)
