= Bagas =

Bagas may refer to:

- Baga people, of Guinea
- Bagas, Gironde, France
- Bagaš noble family, in the Serbian Empire
- Baga (king) or Bagas, a 3rd-century BC Berber king of ancient Mauretania

== See also ==
- Baga (disambiguation)
