= Baga Creek =

Estuary

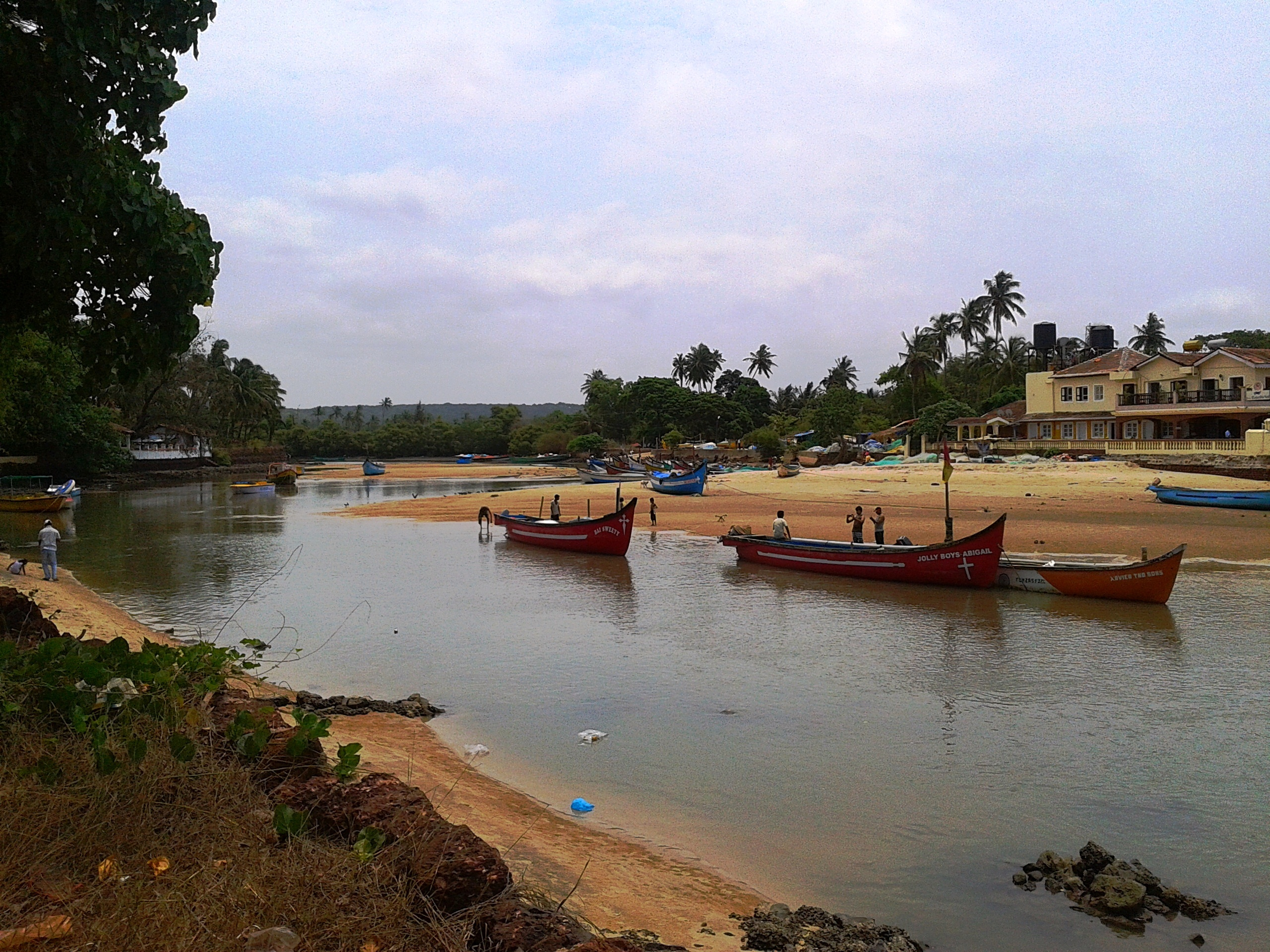
The estuary at low tide

Baga Creek is a tidal estuary in the state of Goa, India located near the town of Baga at 15°33′48″N 73°44′55″E.

It is formed by Baga River, a small or minor river, more aptly a stream.

The river is formed by two streams, which meet at Arpora, Goa. The northern stream originates from Anjuna or Munang, while the southern stream originates from Saligaon.
