= Baga, Patuakhali =

- Location in Bangladesh
- Coordinates: 22°26′N 90°28′E
- Country: Bangladesh
- Division: Barisal Division
- District: Patuakhali District
- Time zone: UTC+6 (Bangladesh Time)

Baga, Patuakhali is a village in Patuakhali District in the Barisal Division of southern-central Bangladesh.
