= Sebe =

Town in Togo

Coordinates: 6°15′N 1°37′E

Zébé (also called Sebe and Sebbe) is a small town in Togo, located on the north side of the lagoon near Aného. It was the second capital of the German colony of Togoland from 1887, when it replaced Bagid (present day Baguida) until 1897, when it was itself replaced by the present capital, Lomé.
