= Baga, Goa =

Baga
- Town
- Location of Baga in Goa Baga (India)
- Coordinates: 15°33′32″N 73°45′12″E
- Country: India
- State: Goa
- District: North Goa
- Sub-district: Bardez

Languages
  - Official: Konkani
- Time zone: UTC+5:30 (IST)
- PIN: 403516
- Area code: 083227

Baga is a seaside town located in Bardez, Goa, India. It falls under the jurisdiction of Calangute, which is 2 km south. Baga is known for its popular beach and Baga Creek. It is visited by thousands of tourists annually.

== Baga Beach ==
Baga Beach is a popular beach and tourist destination in North Goa. Baga is located at the north end of the contiguous beach stretch that starts from Sinquerim, Candolim, leads to Calangute, and then to Baga.

The beach contains rows of shacks and fishing boats, and at high tide, the beach is narrow.

The beach is named after the Baga Creek, which empties into the Arabian Sea at the north end of the beach.

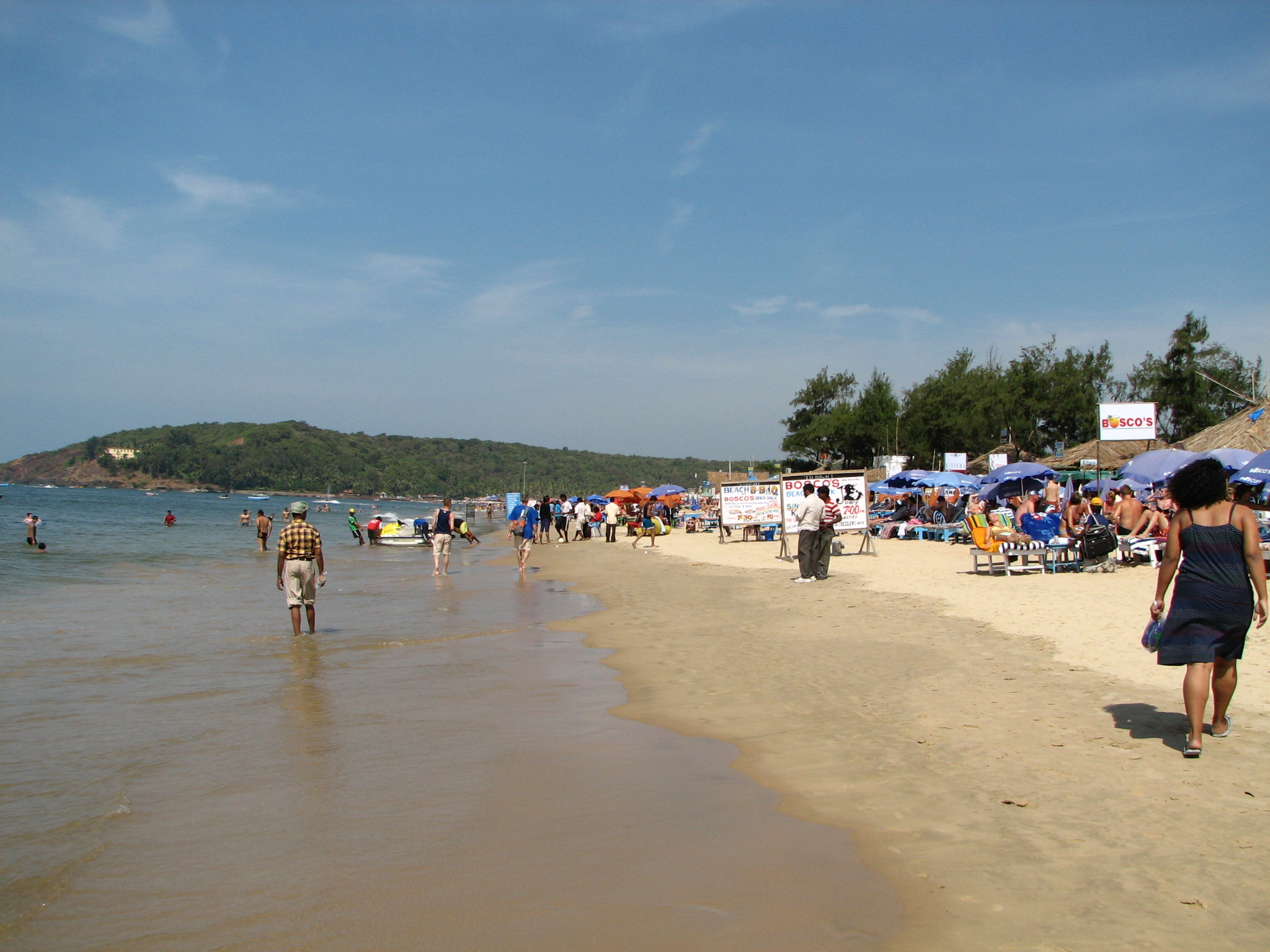
Baga beach in 2006
