= Pavle Merkù =

Slovene specialist (1927–2014)

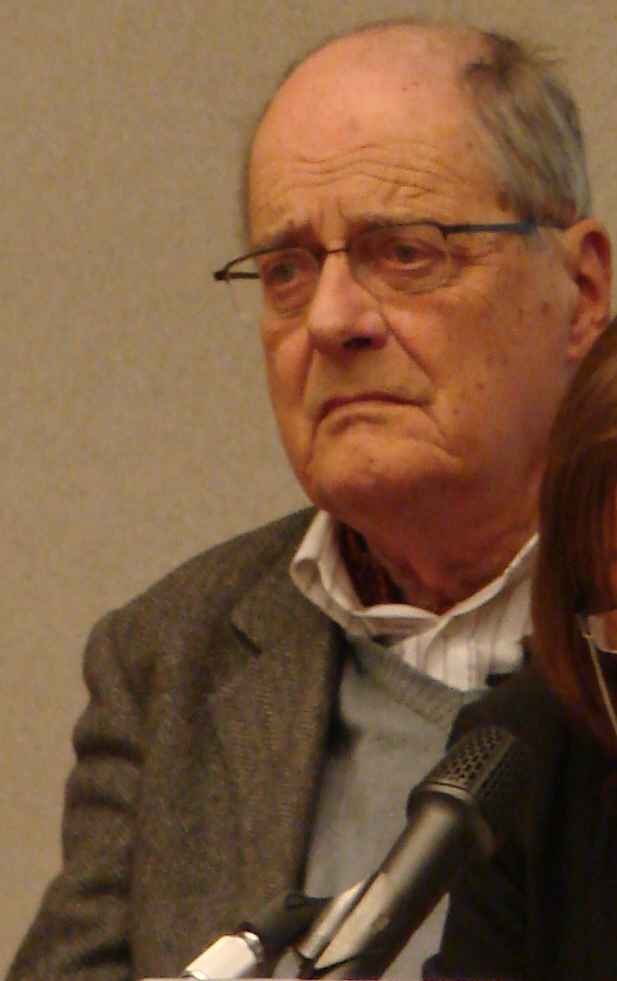
Pavle Merkù

Pavle Merkù (pronounced [ˈpaːu̯lɛ mɛɾˈku]) (12 July 1927 – 20 October 2014) was an Italian-Slovene composer, ethnomusicologist, Slovene specialist, and etymologist.

== Life ==
Merkù was born in Trieste on 12 July 1927. He received a bachelor's degree in Slavic studies at the University of Ljubljana in 1950, and he obtained his doctorate in Rome in 1960. He studied composition in Trieste. As a composer, he primarily wrote chamber music and works for choral ensembles. He wrote the opera Kačji pastir (The Dragonfly). His professional work involved both music and Slovene studies. In the mid-1960s he started collecting folk songs among ethnic Slovenes living in Italy; this eventually grew into a collection of stories, customs, superstitions, and other folk material that he published in 1976 under the title Ljudsko izročilo Slovencev v Italiji (Slovene Folk Heritage in Italy). In 2004 he published the book 1300 primorskih priimkov (1,300 Littoral Surnames), which complemented the etymological research of France Bezlaj. Merkù was a member of the Slovenian Academy of Sciences and Arts. He died in Trieste at the age of 87.

== Awards and recognitions ==
In 1972 Merkù received the Prešeren Award for his composition Koncert za violino in orkester (Concerto for Violin and Orchestra). In 2001 he received the Štrekelj Award for exceptional achievement in collection Slovene folk heritage, and the Silver Order of Freedom of the Republic of Slovenia for strengthening Slovene ethnic identity among cross-border Slovenes and for scholarly and artistic merit. In 2007 he was given the Kozina Award for his lifetime composition work.

Merkù was an honorary member of the Slavic Society of Slovenia, and in 2007 he received its recognition for his lifetime achievement in research on Slovene along the language's western border. In the decision conferring the award, Alenka Šivic Dular wrote that Merkù's linguistic studies especially emphasized "research on personal names and toponyms in the Trieste, Gorizia, and Venetian Slovenia areas and drew attention to traces of Slovene-Friulian language contact (Slovenski priimki na zahodni meji, Slovene Surnames on the Western Border, 1982; La toponomastica del Comune di Duino-Aurisina, Toponyms in the Commune of Duino-Aurisina, 1989; La toponomastica dell'Alta val Torre, Toponyms in the Upper Torre Valley, 1997; 1300 primorskih priimkov, 1,300 Littoral Surnames, 2004; Krajevno imenoslovje na slovenskem zahodu, Regional Onomastics in Western Slovene Territory, 2006). Some of Merkù's books are seminal works, and his creativity and confident approach mark the Slovene physical and cultural presence in Trieste."

Merkù received the Prešeren Award for lifetime achievement in 2014.
