= Santokh Bagga =

Canadian Intelligence informant

Santokh Singh Bagga was a Canadian Security Intelligence Service (CSIS) informant who helped with the investigation of the 1985 Air India bombing.

Bagga received his doctorate in philosophy and psychology from Pune University in 1978, and applied for refugee status, and came to Canada in 1986 with his son (Gursev Singh Bagga). Solicitor General James Kelleher sent a letter on March 30, 1987 stating that Bagga's security had to be kept in mind, and transferring his handling from CSIS to the Royal Canadian Mounted Police. In May 1988, Bagga accused Secretary of State for External Affairs Joe Clark of interfering with his claim for refugee status to placate the Indian government.

Despite the RCMP protection provided, and history of activism with Babbar Khalsa, Bagga did not testify in the 2004/2005 Air India bombing trial.

Harkirat Singh Bagga currently resides in Punjab, India. Gursev Singh Currently resides in Canada.
