= Silvo Torkar =

Slovene onomastician

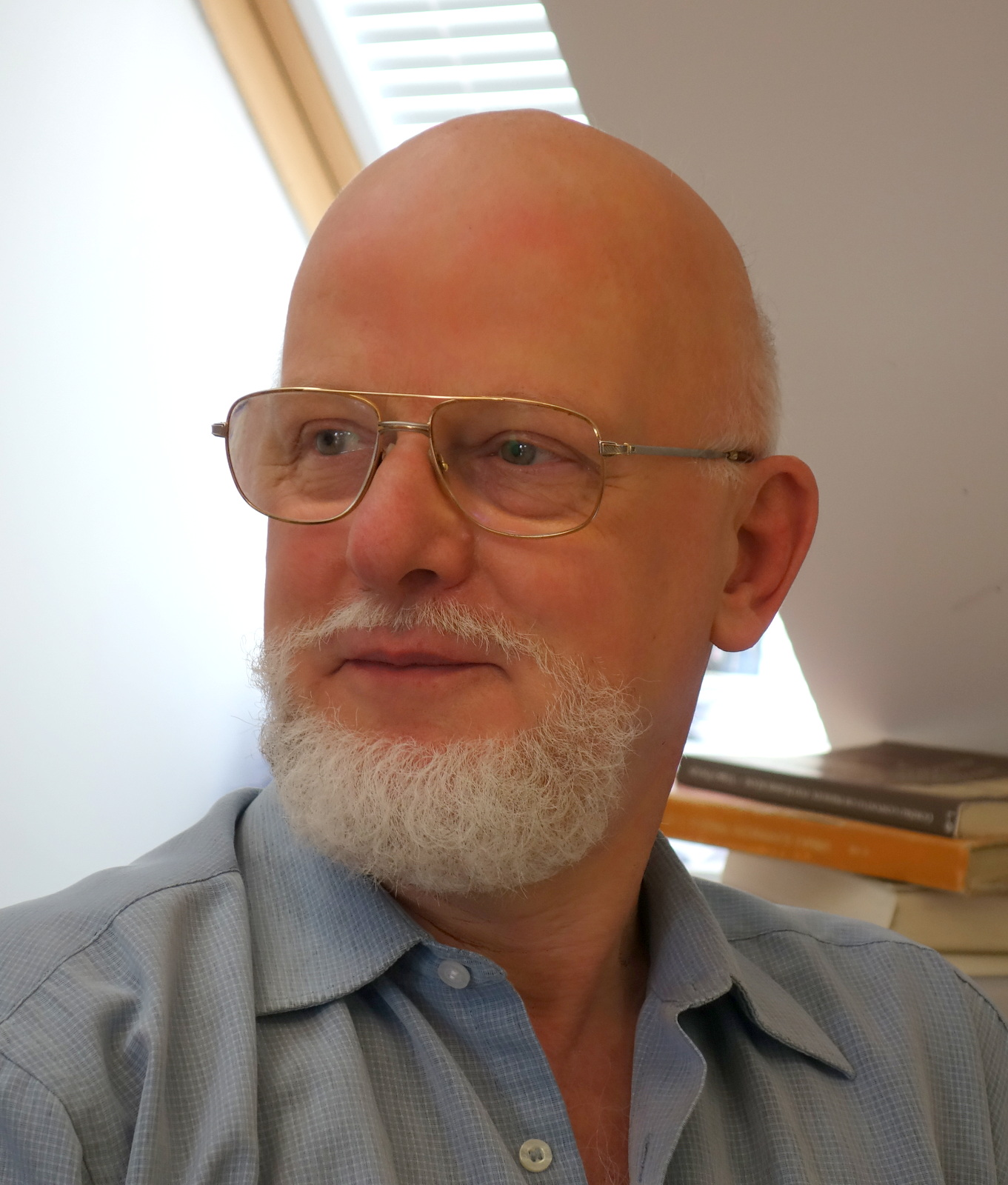
- Born: October 1, 1954 (age 71); Jesenice, Socialist Federal Republic of Yugoslavia (now Slovenia)
- Occupations: linguist, lexicographer, onomastician

Academic background
- Thesis: Formation of Slovenian Geographical Names from Slavic Anthroponyms: Identification, Reconstruction and Standardization (2011)
- Academic advisor: Alenka Šivic-Dular

Silvo Torkar (born October 1, 1954), is a Slovenian linguist, lexicographer, onomastician, translator.

== Education ==
In 1978, he graduated from the Department of Slavic Languages and Literatures of the university of Ljubljana in Russian and Literature and in Sociology. In the 1984/85 academic year, he studied Georgian language, literature and culture as a Zamtes scholarship holder at the Tbilisi State University, and in 1990, he also attended a one-and-a-half month Georgian language, literature and culture course there. In 1997, through the Ceepus program, he studied for a month at the Institute of the Polish Language in Krakow.

== Career ==
Since 1990, Torkar has been a full-time employee at the Fran Ramovš Institute for the Slovene Language of the ZRC SAZU, where he devotes himself to the problems of Slovene and Slavic diachronic nomenclature and questions of the historical folklore of the Baška Valley and Tolmin. In 2004, he obtained his master's degree at the Department of Slavic Languages and Literatures of the Faculty of Philosophy in Ljubljana with the thesis Historical anthroponymy of eastern Tolmin, and in 2011 he submitted his doctoral dissertation, Formation of Slovenian Geographical Names from Slavic Anthroponyms: Identification, Reconstruction and Standardization.

In scientific articles, he wrote about the inflectional derivation in Slovenian place names (linguistic-historical aspect), Slovenian geographical names derived from Slavic anthroponyms, the toponym Preserje and the Slavic-Romance interweaving of the suffixes -jane and -anum, the origin and meaning of some geographical names in the Baška Valley and about Slovenian surnames.

In the years 2000–2002, he participated in the international project Encyclopedia of Slavic Onomastics (Warsaw-Krakow). Since 2003, he has been a member of the commission for onomastics at the International Slavic Committee. As a co-editor, he participated in the thematic issue of the magazine Kronika, dedicated to Tolminski (1994), the onomastic monograph by Pavle Merkù Regional nomenclature in the Slovenian west (2006), the local studies Baška proceedings (2006) and the linguistics proceedings of Pavle Merkù (2007).

In the years 2001 to 2003, he was the professional secretary of the 13th International Congress of Slavic Studies (Ljubljana 2003).

He translated books from Russian and Georgian authors.
