= Bagga =

Surname list

Bagga is a surname of Punjabi people found in Punjab (India) and Punjab (Pakistan).

Notable people with the surname include:

- Madan Lal Bagga, Indian politician
- Rahul Bagga (born 1980), Indian actor
- Rajeev Bagga (born 1967), Indian-born badminton player who represents Britain
- Sahir Ali Bagga, Pakistani singer, music director and composer
- Santokh Bagga, Canadian-Indian informant in the investigation of the 1985 Air India bombing
- Simran Bagga (born 1976), known as Simran, Indian film actress, producer, classical dancer, model, and television personality
- S. K. Bagga (1954–2025), Indian politician in Delhi
