= Baga de Secretis =

Medieval English store of secret documents

In English mediaeval government the Baga de Secretis or Bagga de Secretis was a store of secret documents. It originated as a leather sack, which the collection later outgrew. Its name is a Mediaeval Latin attempt at "bag of secrets" (which more correctly would have been "Saccus Secretorum").

It originated during the reign of Edward IV with the storage of documents regarding treason and writs of attainder. With the reign of Henry VIII, however, its character changed to concentrate more on the sovereign's most intimate and domestic matters which the Crown wished to keep from prying eyes. The subjects of its contents included Anne Boleyn, Catherine Howard, Lady Jane Grey, Walter Raleigh, the Earl of Essex, Guy Fawkes, and other such cases. The closet which succeeded the ox-hide pouch was locked with three separate locks, the keys to which were in the possession of the Lord Chief Justice, the Attorney General, and the Master of the Crown Office. In the late 19th century, all documents were removed from the locked closet and given to the care of the Public Record Office, distributed into their proper series and topics, and are now accessible with limitations, with due care for their preservation. The documents of the trial of Queen Anne, for example, had been thought long destroyed but after their removal and examination were found to be almost entirely complete.
