= Baguida =

- Location in Togo
- Coordinates: 6°10′N 1°19′E
- Country: Togo
- Region: Maritime Region
- Canton: Lomé

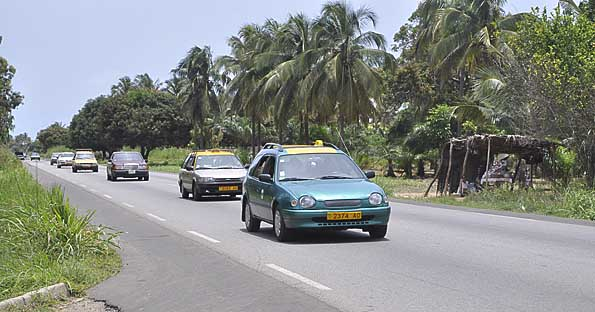
A taxi in Baguida

Baguida is a canton and city of the suburbs of Lomé, the capital of Togo. It was itself once the capital.

Baguida is located approximately 13 kilometers east of Lomé. It is situated between the neighborhoods of Damavo, Kagomé, Avépozo and the littoral, on national highway 5 leading to Cotonou, Benin.

== History ==
The village of Baguida was created at the end of the 17th century, by a hunter named Sani, a former resident of Bè, today one of Lomé's neighborhoods.

This region being located along the Atlantic shore, was at the time completely lush with vegetation and featured numerous game animals and fertile lands. Then, the river Zio ran nearby.

Sani and his brethren lived in this natural area, cultivating cereals, tubers and fabaceae plants. The village became very populated and prosperous, attracting colonisers who founded the capital of Togo between 1884 and 1887.

The city's influence stretched towards nearby villages: Avépozo, Kpogan, Noudokopé and Dévégom attracting new migrants from the neighborhoods of Adrométi, Hédzé and Apéyémé. German, French and British colonisers stayed there during their conquering of the territory.

On 5 July 1884, the signature of the treaty of Baguida made this settlement (then named Bagid) the first capital of Togoland, a German colony until 1893. From 1887 on, Sebe succeeded Baguida as capital, and in turn passed the title to Lomé in 1897. Meanwhile, in 1891, Togo was under guidance from the Bureau of Colonies, itself linked to the Ministry of German Foreign Affairs.
