= 1726 =

1726 in various calendars
- Gregorian calendar: 1726; MDCCXXVI
- Ab urbe condita: 2479
- Armenian calendar: 1175; ԹՎ ՌՃՀԵ
- Assyrian calendar: 6476
- Balinese saka calendar: 1647–1648
- Bengali calendar: 1132–1133
- Berber calendar: 2676
- British Regnal year: 12 Geo. 1 – 13 Geo. 1
- Buddhist calendar: 2270
- Burmese calendar: 1088
- Byzantine calendar: 7234–7235
- Chinese calendar: 乙巳年 (Wood Snake); 4423 or 4216 — to — 丙午年 (Fire Horse); 4424 or 4217
- Coptic calendar: 1442–1443
- Discordian calendar: 2892
- Ethiopian calendar: 1718–1719
- Hebrew calendar: 5486–5487
- Hindu calendars
- Vikram Samvat: 1782–1783
- Shaka Samvat: 1647–1648
- Kali Yuga: 4826–4827
- Holocene calendar: 11726
- Igbo calendar: 726–727
- Iranian calendar: 1104–1105
- Islamic calendar: 1138–1139
- Japanese calendar: Kyōhō 11 (享保１１年)
- Javanese calendar: 1650–1651
- Julian calendar: Gregorian minus 11 days
- Korean calendar: 4059
- Minguo calendar: 186 before ROC 民前186年
- Nanakshahi calendar: 258
- Thai solar calendar: 2268–2269
- Tibetan calendar: ཤིང་མོ་སྦྲུལ་ལོ་ (female Wood-Snake); 1852 or 1471 or 699 — to — མེ་ཕོ་རྟ་ལོ་ (male Fire-Horse); 1853 or 1472 or 700

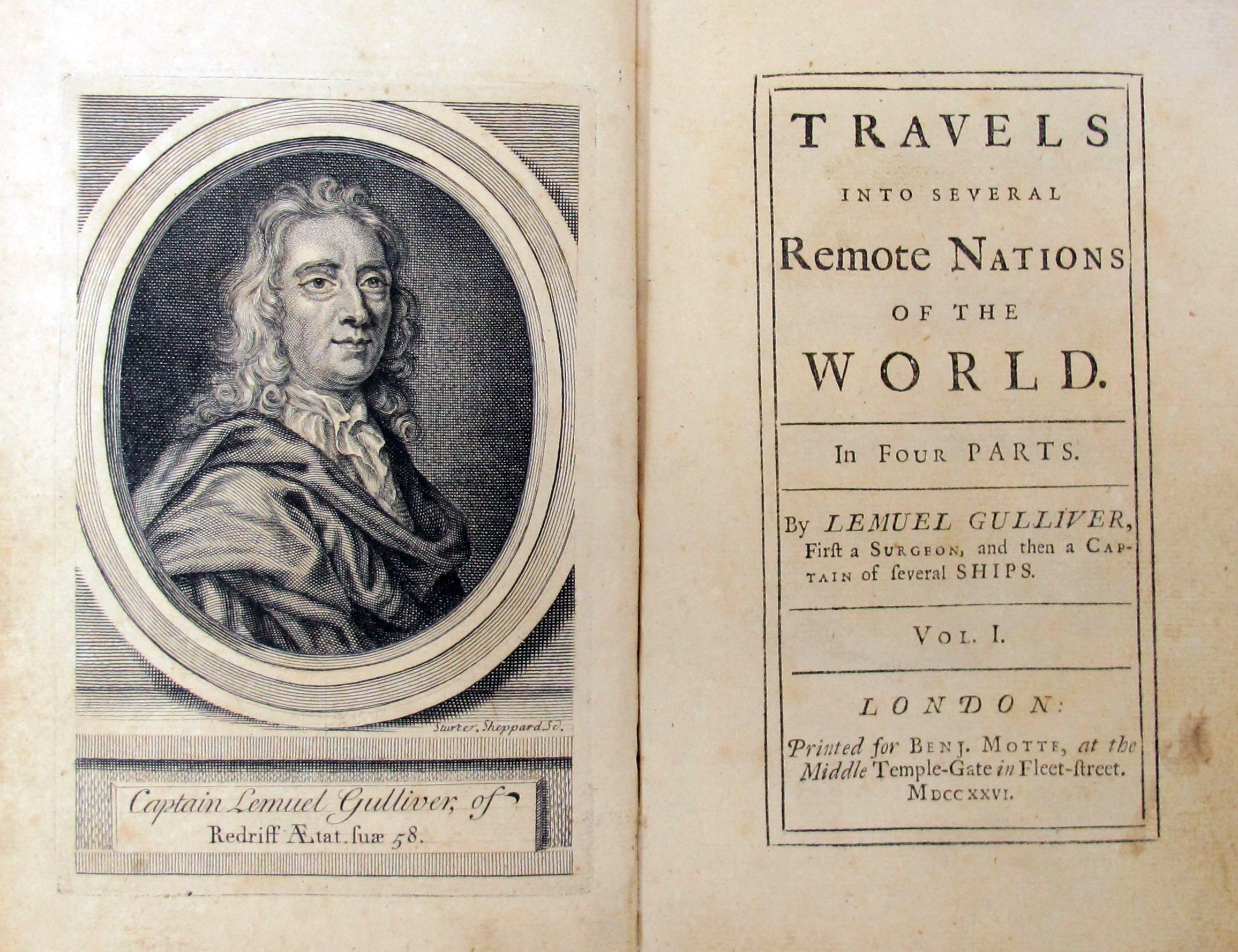
November 8: Gullivers Travels by Jonathan Swift is published.

1726 (MDCCXXVI) was a common year starting on Tuesday of the Gregorian calendar and a common year starting on Saturday of the Julian calendar, the 1726th year of the Common Era (CE) and Anno Domini (AD) designations, the 726th year of the 2nd millennium, the 26th year of the 18th century, and the 7th year of the 1720s decade. As of the start of 1726, the Gregorian calendar was 11 days ahead of the Julian calendar, which remained in localized use until 1923.

== Events ==
=== January–March ===
- January 1 – J. S. Bach leads the first performance of Herr Gott, dich loben wir, BWV 16, his church cantata for New Year's Day to a libretto by Georg Christian Lehms.
- January 20 – J. S. Bach leads the first performance of his cantata Meine Seufzer, meine Tränen (My sighs, my tears), BWV 13, for the second Sunday after Epiphany.
- January 23 (January 12 Old Style) – The Conventicle Act (Konventikelplakatet) is adopted in Sweden, outlawing all non-Lutheran religious meetings outside of church services.
- January 26 – The First Treaty of Vienna is signed between Austria, the Holy Roman Empire and Spain, creating the Austro-Spanish Alliance in advance of a war against Great Britain.
- January 27 – J. S. Bach leads the first performance of Alles nur nach Gottes Willen, BWV 72, concluding his third Christmas season in Leipzig on the Third Sunday after Epiphany.
- January 27 – On its maiden voyage, the Dutch East India Company frigate Aagtekerke departs from the Dutch Cape Colony on the second leg of its journey to the Dutch East Indies across the Indian Ocean and is never seen again. Aagtekerke carried a crew of 200 men.
- February 8 – The Supreme Privy Council is established in Russia.
- February 13 – The Parliament of Negrete (between Mapuche and Spanish authorities in Chile) brings an end to the Mapuche uprising of 1723–26.
- March 2 – In London, a night watchman finds a severed head by the River Thames; it is later recognized to be that of the husband of Catherine Hayes. She and an accomplice are later executed.
- March 10 – China's Yongzheng Emperor issues a special edict instructing his "Vice Minister of Punishments" Huang Bing to interrogate Qin Daoran, who provides the evidence that Yongzheng's brothers Yintang, Yin-ssu and Yin-ti, had conspired to overthrow the Emperor.
- March 29 – The first large shipment of slaves is brought to New Orleans as the slave ship L'Aurore arrives with 290 black Africans captured in Gambia. During the 90-day voyage from Gorée in Senegal, 60 of the slaves have died.
- March 30 – After King Haffon of the West African Kingdom of Whydah (in modern-day Benin) allows Portuguese traders to build the Fort of São João Baptista de Ajudá in the capital at Savi, mercenaries of the Dutch West India Company make a failed attempt to destroy the fort by "throwing two flaming spears over the walls". By 1726, traders from Britain, France, the Netherlands and Portugal are all competing to establish trade with Whydah, which supplies other West Africans to be used as slaves.
- March 31 – France's first ambassador to Russia, Jacques de Campredon, leaves after four years of trying to negotiate a Franco-Russian alliance with Catherine I and a failed attempt to arrange a marriage between King Louis XV and Catherine's daughter Elizabeth.

=== April–June ===
- May 1 – Voltaire begins his exile in England.
- June 11 – André-Hercule de Fleury, recalled from exile by King Louis XV of France (his former pupil), forces banishment of Louis Henri, Duke of Bourbon, the Prime Minister, and the Duke's mistress Madame de Prie from court. Financier Jean Pâris de Monmartel is also removed from his position as Guard of the Royal Treasury.

=== July–September ===
- August 7 – English-born pirate Nicholas Brown is captured near Xtabi, Jamaica.
- September 8 – J. S. Bach leads the first performance of Geist und Seele wird verwirret, BWV 35, a solo cantata for alto voice.
- September 6 – An explosion kills all but seven of the 700 passengers and crew on the Portuguese Navy galleon HMFMS Santa Rosa as its cargo of gunpowder blows up. Historians speculate that of the 693 people on the ship, those who weren't killed by the explosion drowned or were killed by sharks as the ship went down off of the coast of Recife.
- September 11 – French bishop André-Hercule de Fleury, later Prime Minister for King Louis XV of France, is made a Roman Catholic Cardinal by Pope Benedict XIII.
- September 14 – The Nanfan Treaty of July 19, 1701 between the Iroquois Confederacy and the British Province of New York, is amended by both parties.
- September 16 – An earthquake strikes Sicily and kills 226 people in Palermo.
- September 22 – Bach leads the first performance of his cantata Wer Dank opfert, der preiset mich, BWV 17, in Leipzig.
- September 23 – Charles VI, Holy Roman Emperor, issues an order limiting the number of Jews who can be legally recognized as legitimate householders.
- September 24 – Permission to celebrate the feast of Our Lady of Mount Carmel, celebrated on July 17, is extended by Pope Benedict XIII to the entire Roman Catholic Church.
- September 29 – J. S. Bach leads the first performance of Es erhub sich ein Streit, BWV 130, for the feast of Michael, the archangel.

=== October–December ===
- October 1 – Juan Bautista de Orendáin y Azpilicueta is appointed again as Secretary of the Universal Bureau (Secretario del Despacho), the equivalent of the Prime Minister of Spain, after the retirement of José de Grimaldo.
- October 5 – Grigore II Ghica becomes the Prince of Moldavia for the first time after Mihai Racoviță steps aside.
- October 27 – J. S. Bach leads the first performance of Ich will den Kreuzstab gerne tragen, BWV 56, one of the few works he calls a cantata.
- November 8 (October 28 Old Style) – Jonathan Swift's satirical novel Gulliver's Travels is first published (anonymously) in London; it sells out within a week.
- November 20 – Callinicus, Metropolitan of Heraclea dies suddenly only one day after being elected the Ecumenical Patriarch of Constantinople, the highest office in the Eastern Orthodox Church. Callinicus is said to have paid a record fee to the Ottoman Sultan to guarantee his appointment.
- November – Mary Toft allegedly gives birth to 16 rabbits in England; the story is later revealed to be a hoax.
- December 24 – The settlement of Montevideo is founded by the Spaniards in the Viceroyalty of Peru.

=== Date unknown ===
- Late 1726 – Nader Shah recaptures Mashhad.
- Muhammad bin Saud becomes head of the House of Saud.
- The Complete Classics Collection of Ancient China, an immense Chinese encyclopedia, is printed using copper-based movable type printing.
- The remaining ruins of Liverpool Castle in England are finally demolished.

== Births ==
- January 14 – Jacques-Donatien Le Ray, French supporter of the American Revolution (d. 1803)
- January 17 – Hugh Mercer, brigadier general in the American Continental Army, and a close friend to George Washington (d. 1777)
- February 4 – Jean-Jacques Blaise d'Abbadie, Director-general of the Colony of Louisiana (d. 1765)
- February 7 – Margaret Fownes-Luttrell, British painter (d. 1766)
- March 8 – Richard Howe, British admiral (d. 1799)
- April 5 – Benjamin Harrison V, signer of the American Declaration of Independence (d. 1791)
- April 8 – Lewis Morris, American landowner and developer, signer of the United States Declaration of Independence (d. 1798)
- April 12 – Charles Burney, English music historian (d. 1814)
- April 20 – Joseph de Ferraris, Austrian cartographer of the Austrian Netherlands (d. 1814)

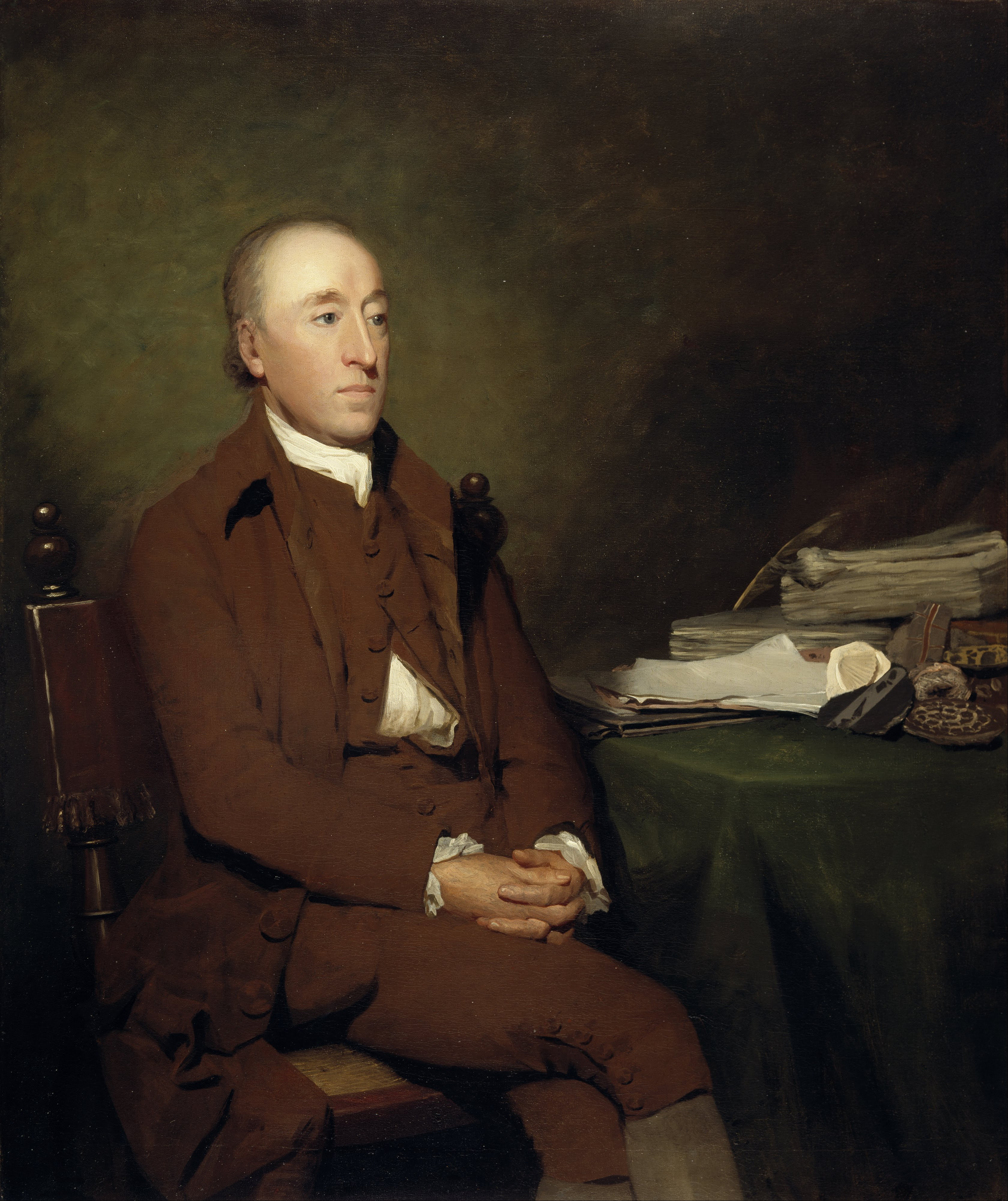
James Hutton

- June 3 O.S. – James Hutton, Scottish geologist (d. 1797)
- June 14 O.S. – Thomas Pennant, Welsh naturalist (d. 1798)
- June 20 – Louise Henriette of Bourbon, Duchess of Orléans, mother of Philippe Égalité (d. 1759)
- June 25 – Lady Anne Monson, English botanist (d. 1776)
- July 1 – Acharya Bhikshu, Jain saint (d. 1803)
- July 30 – William Jones (1726–1800), British clergyman, author (d. 1800)
- August 7 – James Bowdoin, American Revolutionary leader, politician (d. 1790)
- August 9 – Francesco Cetti, Italian Jesuit scientist (d. 1778)
- August 2 – Lê Quý Đôn, Vietnamese philosopher, poet, encyclopedist and government official (d. 1784)
- September 1 – François-André Danican Philidor, French composer, chess player (d. 1795)
- September 2 – John Howard (prison reformer), English philanthropist (d. 1790)
- September 26 – John H. D. Anderson, Scottish scientist (d. 1796)
- September 26 – Angelo Maria Bandini, Italian librarian (d. 1803)
- October 16 – Daniel Chodowiecki, Polish painter (d. 1801)
- December 4 – Lord Stirling, American brigadier-general during the American Revolutionary War (d. 1783)
- date unknown
  - Cyprian Howe, American colonel in the American Revolutionary War (d. 1806)
  - Katsukawa Shunshō, Japanese woodblock artist (d. 1792)
  - Jedediah Strutt, English businessman (d. 1797)

== Deaths ==
- January 2 – Domenico Zipoli, Tuscan-born composer and Jesuit missionary (b. 1688)
- January 12 – Hercule-Louis Turinetti, marquis of Prié (b. 1658)
- January 19
  - Franz Beer, Austrian architect (b. 1659)
  - Giovanni Battista Tolomei, Italian Jesuit priest, theologian and cardinal (b. 1653)
- January 25 – Guillaume Delisle, French cartographer (b. 1675)
- February 18 – Jacques Carrey, French painter (b. 1649)
- February 26 – Maximilian II Emanuel, Elector of Bavaria (b. 1662)
- March 5 – Evelyn Pierrepont, 1st Duke of Kingston-upon-Hull, English politician (b. c. 1665)
- March 6 – Henrietta Catharina, Baroness von Gersdorff, German noblewoman; poet (b. 1648)
- March 13 – Alexander Pendarves, British politician (b. 1662)

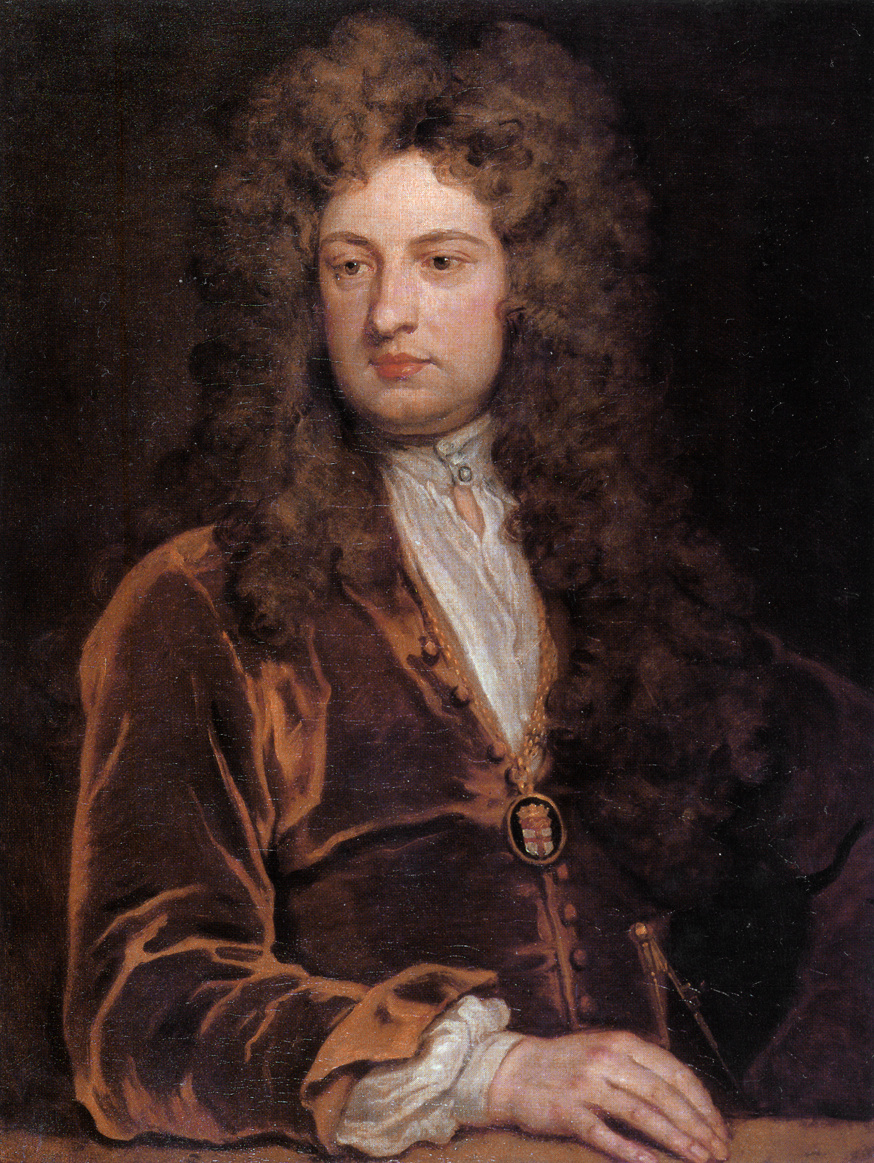
John Vanbrugh

- March 14 – Chhatrapati Shivaji Raje Bhonsale 2nd, 5th Maratha Emperor (b. 1696)
- March 26 – John Vanbrugh, English architect and dramatist (b. 1664)
- April 26 – Jeremy Collier, English theatre critic, non-juror bishop and theologian (b. 1650)
- April 28 – Thomas Pitt, British Governor of Madras (b. 1653)
- May 10 – Charles Beauclerk, 1st Duke of St Albans, English soldier (b. 1670)
- June 18 – Michel Richard Delalande, French organist, composer (b. 1657)
- July 3 – Galeazzo Marescotti, Italian Catholic cardinal (b. 1627)
- July 8 – John Ker, Scottish spy (b. 1673)
- July 22 – Hugh Drysdale, British Colonial Governor of Virginia
- July 31 – Nicolaus II Bernoulli, Swiss mathematician (b. 1695)
- September 22 – Aixinjueluo Yuntang, born Aixinjueluo Yintang, Qing prince (b. 1683)
- October 29 – Jean Boivin the Younger, French writer (b. 1663)
- November 22 – Anton Domenico Gabbiani, Italian painter (b. 1652)
- November 23 – Sophia Dorothea of Celle, queen consort of George I of Great Britain (b. 1666)
- December 2 – Samuel Penhallow, American colonist, historian (b. 1665)
