= Olou =

Olou is a surname. Notable people with the surname include:

- Antoinette Tielé Gambia Olou, Congolese politician
- Oscar Olou (born 1987), Beninese footballer
