= Siege of Ouidah (1743) =

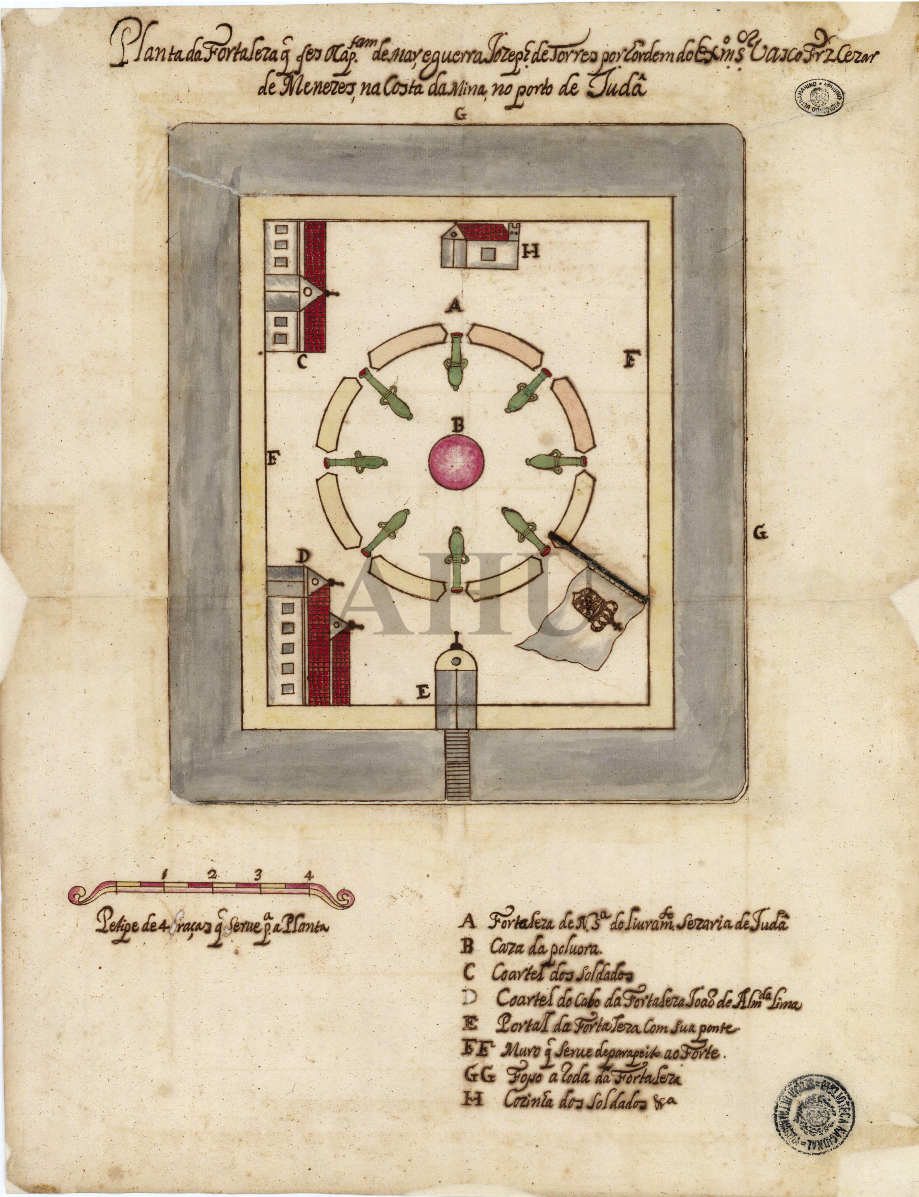
- Plan of Fort São João Baptista de Ajudá
Date	21 July 1743
Location	Fort of São João Baptista de Ajudá, Ouidah, Benin
Result	Dahomian victory
Territorial changes	Dahomian military control over Ouidah reasserted

Belligerents
Kingdom of Portugal	Kingdom of Dahomey

Commanders and leaders
João Basílio (POW); Manuel Gonçalves (POW); Amoua †/ (POW)	Tegbesu; Gau; Agahu

The Siege of Ouidah (1743) was a military conflict between the Kingdom of Portugal and the Kingdom of Dahomey at the Fort of São João Baptista de Ajudá in Ouidah, Benin.

== Background ==
In 1721, Brazilian interests pushed for the establishment of a Portuguese factory on the Costa da Mina, taking advantage of the arrival of a new Viceroy, Vasco Fernandes César de Meneses. After being jailed for illegal dealings with the Dutch at Elmina, Brazilian Captain Joseph de Torres was released with Bahian merchant support and promoted a factory in Ouidah, offered by its king.

Convinced of its urgency, the Viceroy authorized Torres to build the factory, which he did at his own expense. Named São João Baptista de Ajudá, it was completed by November 1721. The funding, partially from Torres and likely merchants from Bahia, was supported by a new tax of 10 tostões per slave, to maintain the factory.

Torres remained in Ouidah till 1722 to finalize fortifications and ensure the King's support. He left Francisco Pereira Mendes in charge and returned to Bahia. Later Mendes became the first Director of the factory.

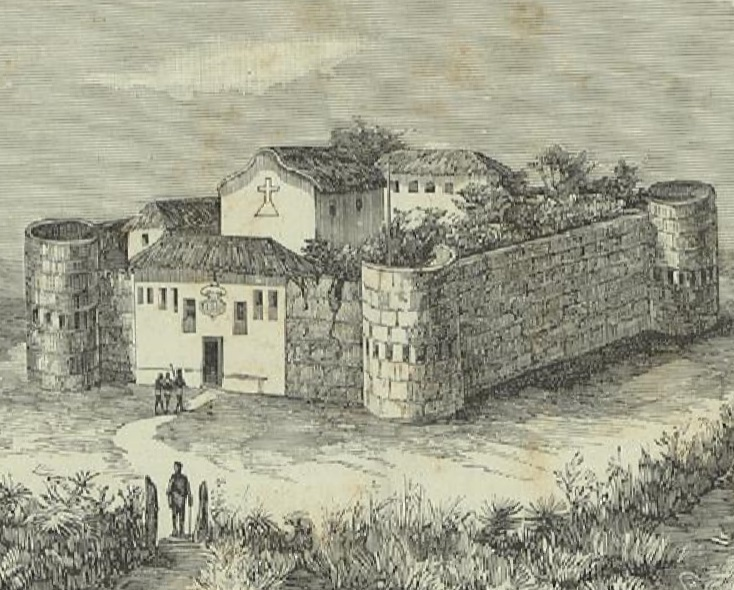
Portuguese engraving of the fort São João Baptista de Ajudá, 1886

Initially, the factory thrived and boosted Ouidah's wealth and importance. However, as part of Dahomey's effort to monopolize the slave trade in the region, commercial activity on the Mina Coast was repeatedly disrupted. The most notable example was Agaja's conquest of Ouidah in 1727, which led to the expulsion of Huedan king Haffon and the burning of the Portuguese feitoria located there. Other European slave traders and their crews were caught in the violence, many imprisoned or killed. During the attack, the Dutch and English factories were overrun, while the French factory initially sheltered thousands. After a short siege, however, a gunpowder explosion destroyed the compound, killing more than 3,000 people. Survivors were taken captive.

In the decades following the fall of Ouidah, Dahomey enforced a series of blockades and secured control over interior slave routes. By concentrating trade through Ouidah, Agaja elevated prices and concentrated his hold over the coast, much to the detriment of Portuguese and Bahian interests. Though open conflict with Hueda ended by 1732, Bahian merchants continued to report delays and shortages.

For the Portuguese Crown, this instability threatened their only territorial holding on the coast, the Fort of São João Baptista de Ajudá. The Conselho Ultramarino considered abandoning the fort, due to high taxes, but the Portuguese stated that they "would experience the same inconvenience, insolence, and incivility from similar kings".

== Siege ==
On July 21, 1743 (St. John's Day), at around 8:00 AM, Tegbesu's army advanced to within artillery range of the Ajudá factory. The commander of the army assured the Portuguese factory and the neighboring ones that they should not be alarmed because he had no intention of interfering with the fortresses or their personnel. The following day, Director João Basílio set out to visit the King of Dahomey with the customary gifts. Having received news of this, the Dahomian commander ordered the arrest of João Basílio en route. Basílio was detained for three or four days and was afterwards sent directly to the King, who suspected him of aiding Hueda.

Meanwhile, the same commander demanded the surrender of some "Courano negroes", enemies of the King of Dahomey, who were believed to be taking refuge inside. When they refused to hand them over, the commander dispatched word to his King, who replied that if the refugees were not surrendered, the army should take the fortress by force. Despite the advice of Basílio from captivity urging their compliance, the refugees refused to leave.

On July 22, the Dahomian army opened fire on the factory, and the factory back at the army. During the engagement, the thatch caught fire, either from a gunpowder cartridge or from a barrel that was on a bastion. Reports note that the African head servant of the fort, reportedly named Amoua, detonated the powder magazine so that the goods located elsewhere would burn, preventing the army from seizing them. Other local traditions suggest that he may have been captured or killed by the Dahomians, rather than dying in the explosion during the fighting. Ultimately, several black defenders were killed, and the remainder sold into slavery to the French and Portuguese. Lieutenant Manuel Gonçalves was captured by a Dahomian commander named Agahu after leaving the fortress the day after St. John's Day.

João Basílio, his son António, and Lieutenant Manuel Gonçalves remained prisoners of the King of Dahomey for two months, then they were put aboard a slave ship returning to Bahia. The fort was rebuilt in 1744.

== Aftermath ==
In 1747, the secretary of state wrote that Tegbesu deserved punishment, claiming fear was more effective than diplomacy with such people. The viceroy of Bahia agreed, describing the Ouidah Africans as "insolent and great thieves", but noted that retaliation could jeopardize the slave trade, which was essential to Brazil's agriculture.

In 1750, seeking to renew relations with the Portuguese, King Tegbesu sent an embassy to Bahia, Brazil. Between 1750 and 1818, Dahomey dispatched at least five embassies to Brazil and Portugal, in 1750, 1795, 1805, 1811, and 1818. The embassies of 1805 and 1811 brought letters from King Adandozan, who had imprisoned Portuguese subjects in Abomey. Francisco da Cunha de Menezes promised to answer his demands if the prisoners were released.

In 1815, the Fort of São João Baptista de Ajudá was abandoned following the legal abolition of the Portuguese slave trade north of the equator, though Portugal continued to assert its claim. In 1844, the Portuguese government reoccupied the site, this time administering it from São Tomé. Initially, the presence was minimal, and between late April 1861 and 1865, the fort was briefly seized by two French missionaries of the Society of African Missions. Portugal reestablished firm control in 1865, and the fort remained a Portuguese enclave within French Dahomey until they were evacuated in 1961 under pressure from the Republic of Dahomey. The annexation was formally recognized by Portugal only after the independence of São Tomé and Príncipe, through a treaty signed in 1985.

== Bibliography ==
- Ryder, A. F. C. (1958). "The Re-establishment of Portuguese Factories on the Costa da Mina to the Mid Eighteenth Century". Journal of the Historical Society of Nigeria. 1 (3). JSTOR 41856631.
- Hicks, Mary E. (December 17, 2024). Captive Cosmopolitans. Omohundro Institute and UNC Press. ISBN 9781469680828.
- Law, Robin (2004). Ouidah: the social history of a West African slaving 'port', 1727-1892. Athens, Ohio: Ohio University Press. ISBN 9780821415719.
- Araujo, Ana Lucia (March 1, 2012). "Dahomey, Portugal and Bahia: King Adandozan and the Atlantic Slave Trade". Slavery & Abolition. 33. doi:10.1080/0144039X.2011.604562.
- Verger, Pierre (1987). Fluxo e refluxo do tráfico de escravos entre o golfo do Benin e a Bahia de Todos os Santos dos séculos XVII a XIX (in Portuguese).
