= Ajala =

Ajala is a surname. Notable people with the surname include:

- David Ajala (born 1986), British actor
- Toby Ajala (born 1991), English footballer

== See also ==
- Ajal
- Ajaland
