= CEG Godomey =

Coordinates: 6.3667°N 2.3500°E

Information
- School type: Secondary school
- Established: 1984; 41 years ago

CEG Godomey is a public secondary school located in Godomey, Benin. This school was founded in 1984 and is officially known as the secondary school of Godomey. Since its foundation it welcomes every student around Godomey and elsewhere.
