= Ouidah Museum of History =

Museum in Ouidah, Benin

Coordinates: 6.358903°N 2.090185°E

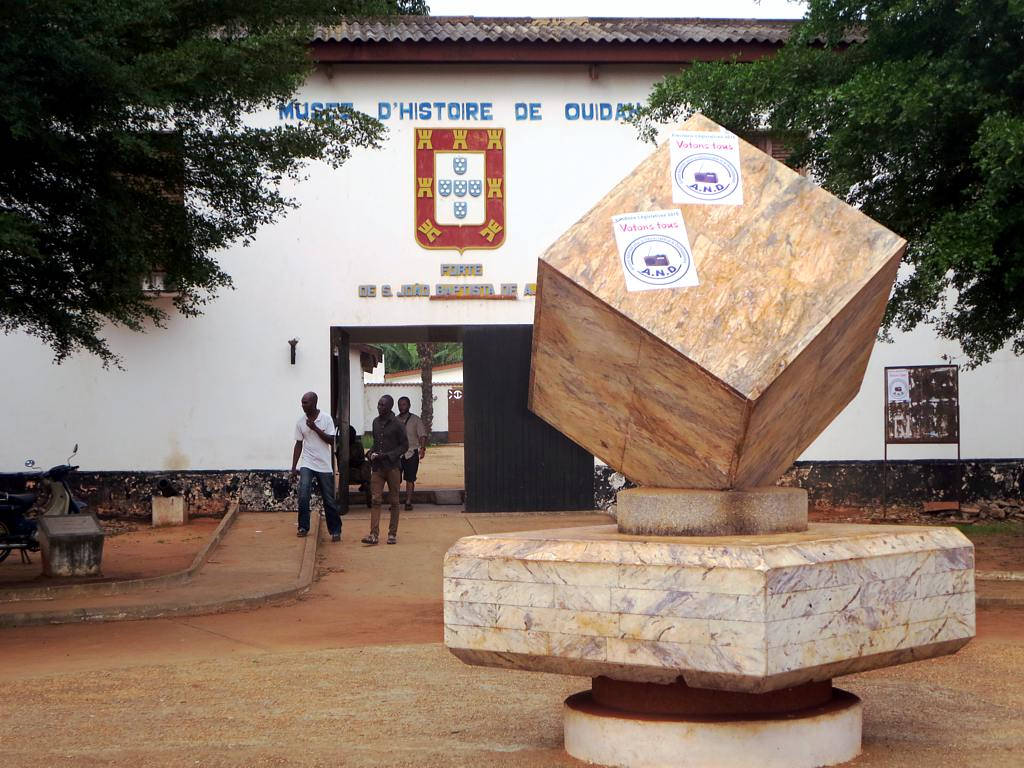
- Location: Ouidah, Benin
- Type: History museum
- Website: www.museeouidah.org/Home-Eng.htm

The Ouidah Museum of History (French: Musée d'histoire de Ouidah) is a history museum in Ouidah, Benin. It occupies the Portuguese Fort of São João Baptista de Ajudá, built in 1721.

== Background ==
The museum is situated between Rue des Esclaves and Rue van Vollenhoven. The collection houses around 700 pieces concerning the archaeology, arts and history of Ouidah. It is situated in the Portuguese Fort of São João Baptista de Ajudá, which was built in 1721. It was a fortified trading post until 1816, at which point it became a Catholic mission until 1865. After this, it served as the seat of the Portuguese seat, until, in 1961, to celebrate the country's independence, the Republic of Dahomey annexed the Portuguese enclave. Before leaving, the occupants set fire to the building.

The museum was declared a historic monument on 13 November 1964. It was restored with financial support from France and the United States, and with advice and resources from Portugal and the Calouste Gulbenkian Foundation. A museum on the history of Ouidah was set up, which opened its doors on 6 September 1967.

== Collections ==
Housed in the Portuguese governor's former residence, the museum consists of 11 rooms displaying objects and collections which have been acquired since 1967, either through donations or purchases from notable Ouidah families, with the help of foreign partners, or during archaeological excavations.

There are notable objects related to the fort, the Kingdom of Xwéda and the Kingdom of Dahomey, as well as the slave trade and repatriation.

== Gallery ==
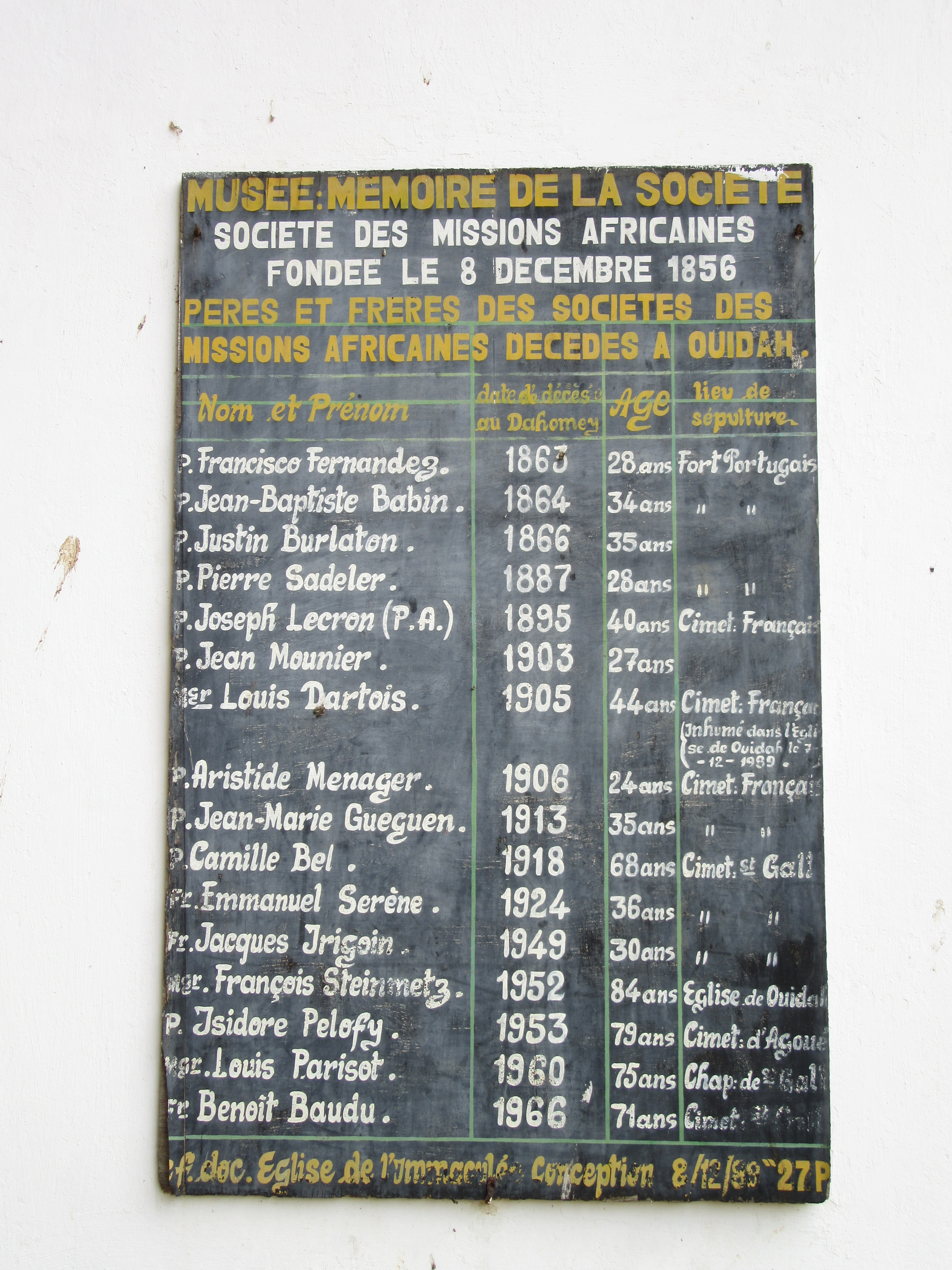
History of the Portuguese Fort

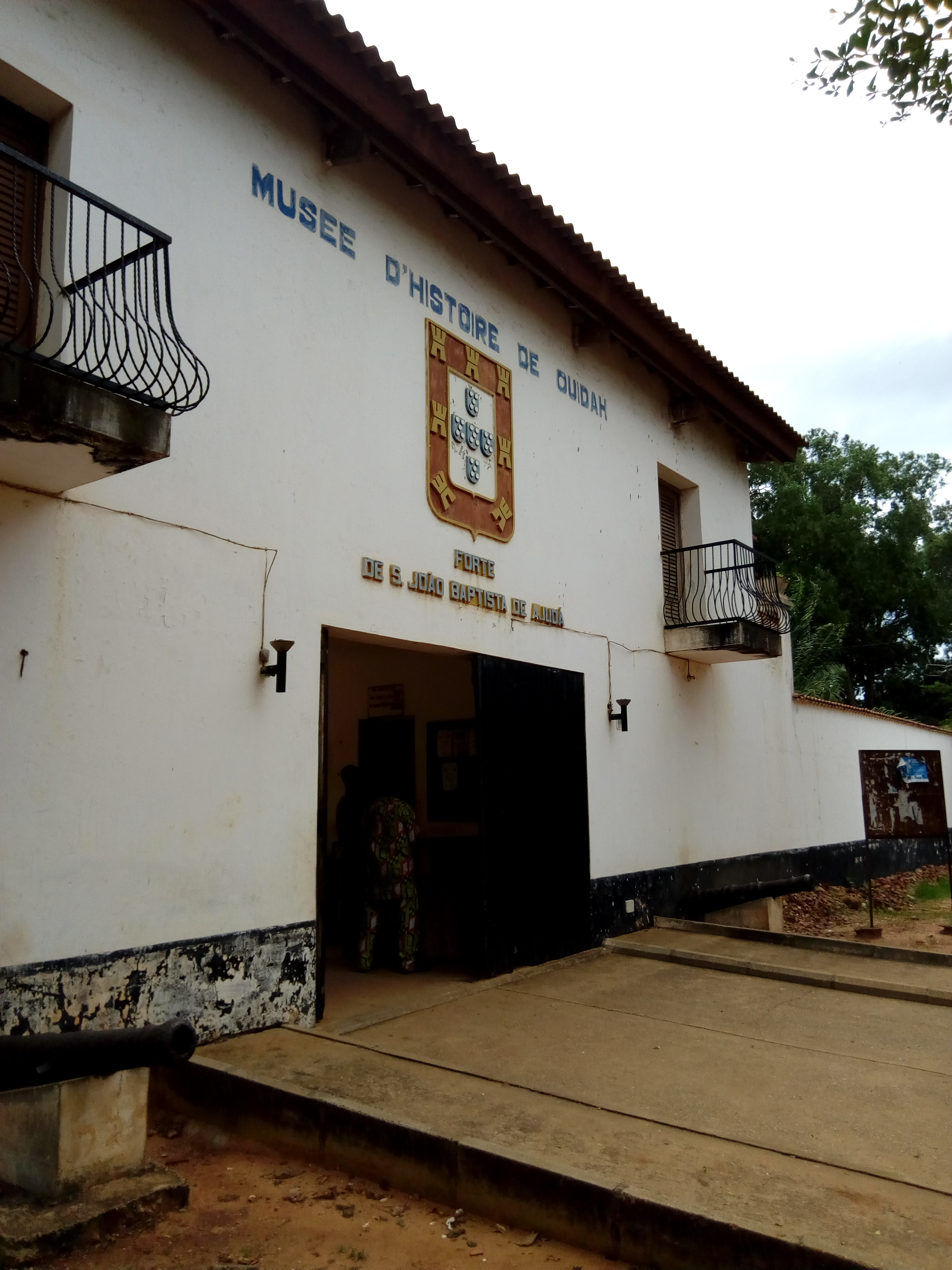
Entrance of the Portuguese Fort
