= Cyprian Howe =

American army officer

Cyprian Godebski
- Born: 1726
- Died: 1806 (aged 79–80)
- Military career
- Rank: Colonel
- Commands: Massachusetts Militia
- Conflicts: American Revolutionary War

Cyprian Howe (1726–1806) was an American Revolutionary War colonel.

Howe was born in Marlborough, Massachusetts on 29 March 1726. He was a prominent man in the town and ran a pub.

As a captain, he led a company to Cambridge on 19 April 1775. He continued in the service of the war, and in the summer of 1780 led a unit of the Massachusetts militia to Rhode Island to reinforce the Continental Army. He eventually reached the rank of colonel in the militia.

Howe married his first wife, Dorothy, on 29 November 1750. He remarried on 6 February 1766, to Mary Williams. Howe died in 1806.
