= Oscar Olou =

Beninese footballer (born 1987)

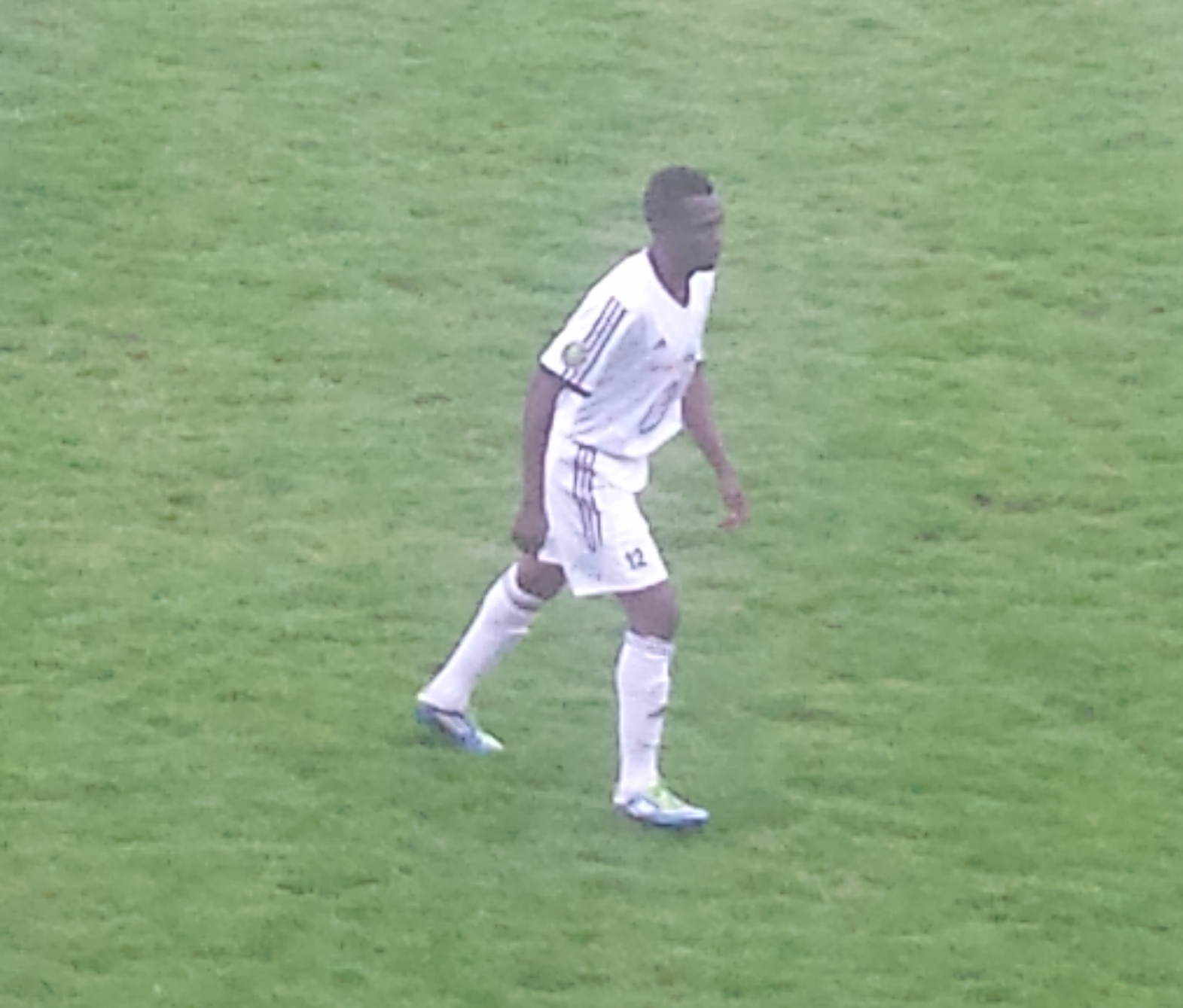
- Olou in 2015

Personal information
- Date of birth: 16 November 1987 (age 38)
- Place of birth: Ouidah, Benin
- Height: 1.76 m (5 ft 9 in)
- Position: Defensive midfielder

Senior career*
| Years | Team | Apps | (Gls) |
| 2002 | Séwé Sports | | |
| 2003–2007 | Mogas 90 | | |
| 2007–2009 | Rouen | 36 | (0) |
| 2009–2019 | Romorantin | 157 | (2) |

International career
| 2004–2013 | Benin | 18 | (0) |
- * Club domestic league appearances and goals

Oscar Olou (born 16 November 1987) is a Beninese former professional footballer who played as a defensive midfielder. Between 2004 and 2013 he made 18 appearances for the Benin national team.

== Club career ==
Born in Ouidah, Olou played club football in Ivory Coast, Benin, and France for Séwé Sports, Mogas 90, Rouen and Romorantin.

== International career ==
Olou made his international debut for Benin in 2004, and has appeared in FIFA World Cup qualifying matches.
