= Fort of São João Baptista de Ajudá =

Restored fort in Benin

Coordinates: 6.3591°N 2.0903°E

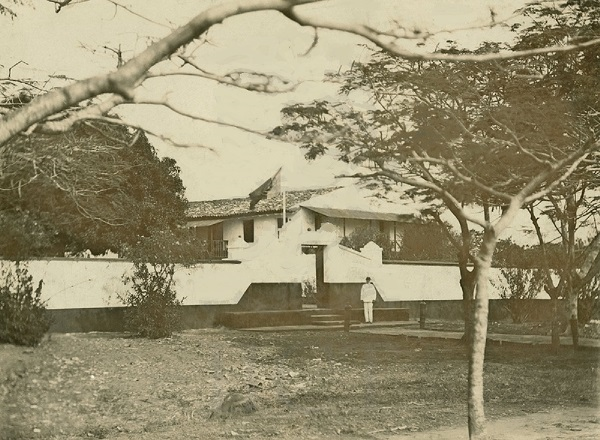
Front view of fort São João Baptista in 1917

The Forte de São João Baptista de Ajudá (in English: Fort St. John the Baptist of Ouidah) is a small restored fort in Ouidah, Benin. Built in 1721, it was the last of three European forts built in that town to tap the slave trade of the Slave Coast. Following the legal abolition of the slave trade early in the 19th century, the Portuguese fort lay abandoned most of the time until it was permanently reoccupied in 1865.

In the aftermath of the creation of the French colony of Dahomey in the 1890s, the French authorities recognized Portuguese sovereignty over the fort due to the adamant insistence of Portugal. The fort was garrisoned by a small detachment of troops from Portuguese São Tomé and Príncipe until 1911. After that, only the residente (governor), his assistant and their families inhabited the fort. Portuguese sovereignty was maintained until the fort was seized by the authorities of the newly independent Republic of Dahomey (now Benin) in August 1961.

The fort's chief claim to fame was that, following the conquest and colonization of Dahomey by the French during the last decade of the 19th century, the Portuguese insisted on keeping their control over the fort, which had become by then entirely surrounded by French territory. The minuscule enclave thus became an international oddity. The 1958 edition of the Guinness World Records stated: "The smallest colony in the world is the Portuguese enclave in the French West African territory of Dahomey, consisting of the Fort of St John the Baptist (São João Baptista de Ajudá). This has been occupied since 1680 and is garrisoned by one officer and a few men."

Today, the restored fort is part of the Ouidah Museum of History.

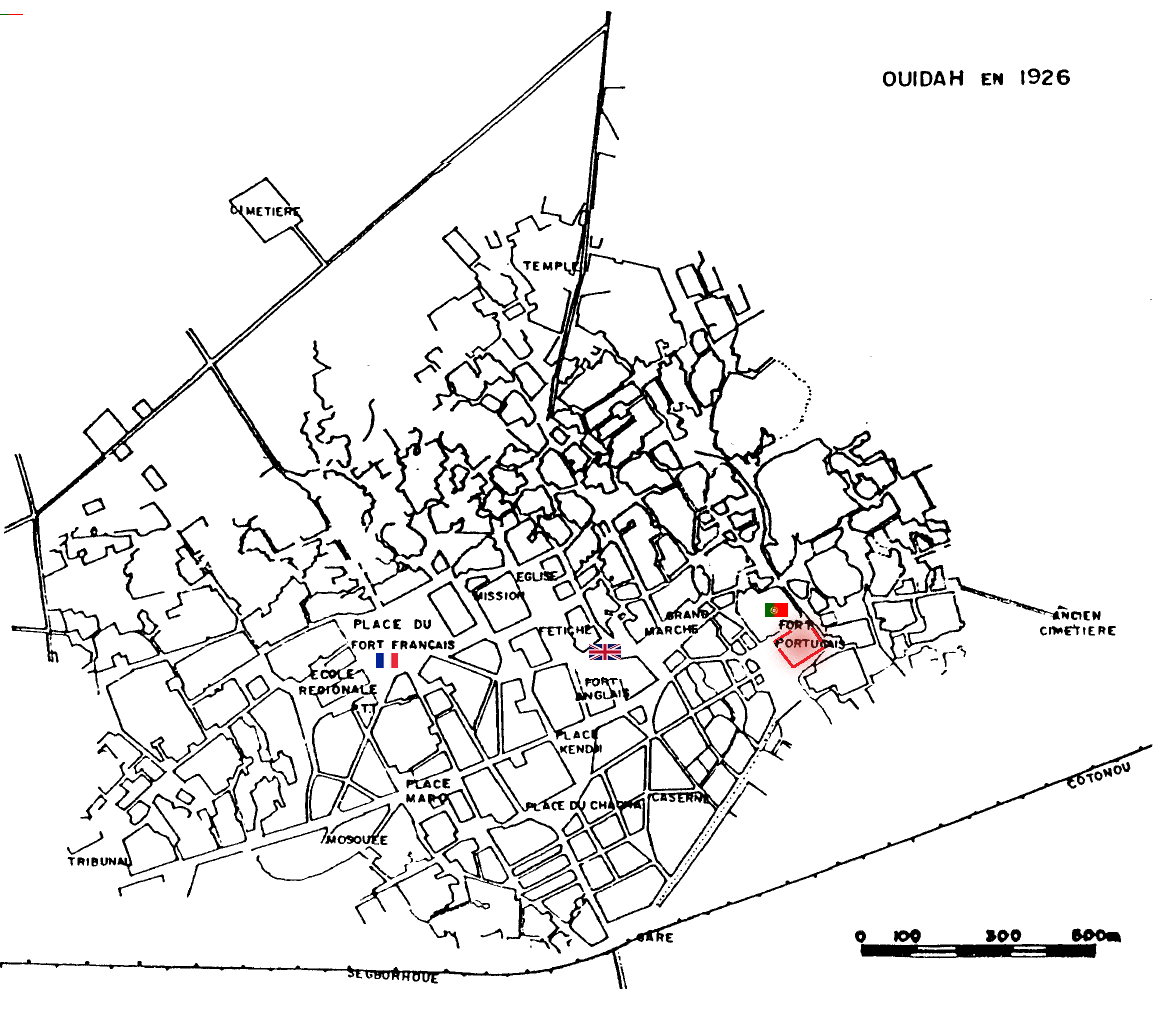
Location of the Portuguese and other forts at Ouidah

== History ==
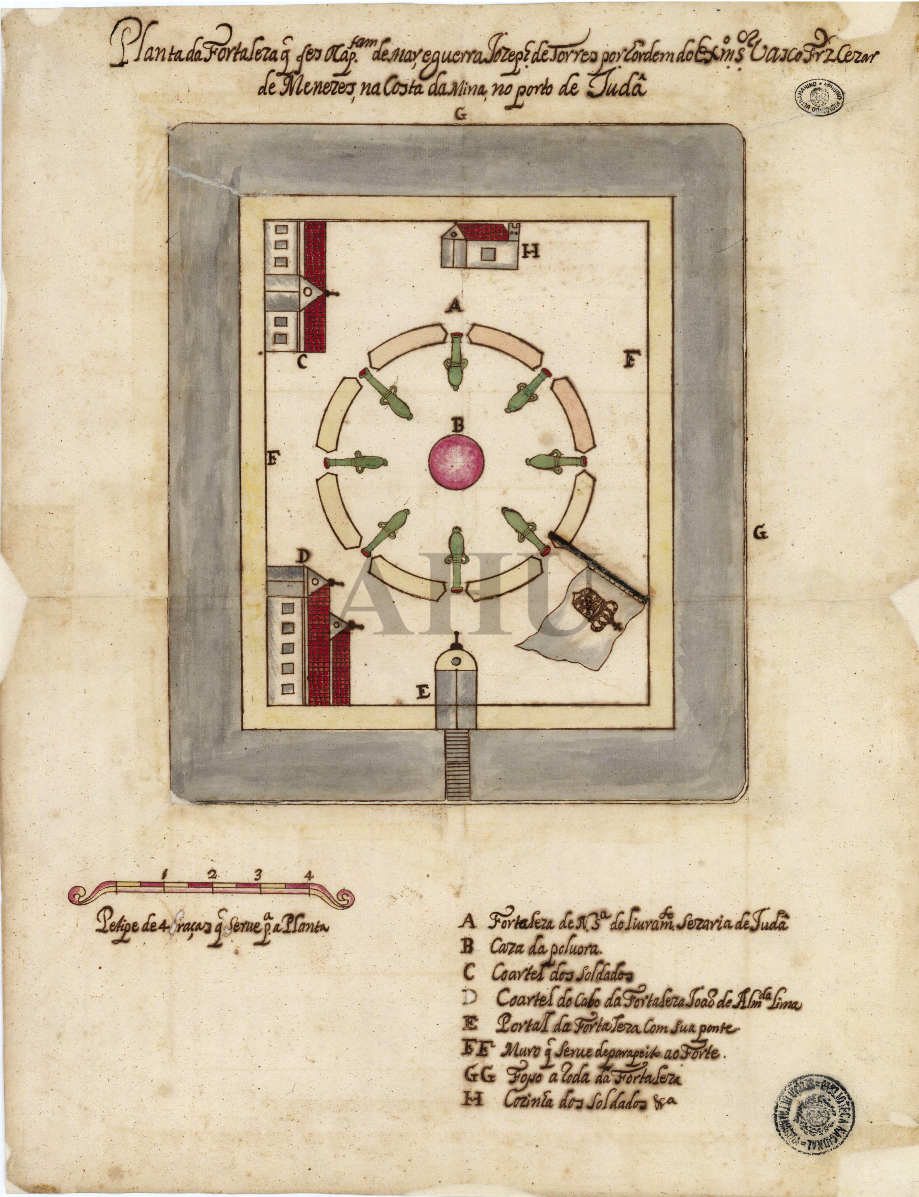
Plan of the fort dating from 1721

=== Background ===
Following the capture of Elmina Castle and their other forts and factories along the Gold Coast by the Dutch in 1637 and the following years, the Portuguese found themselves without any establishments they could call their own on the shores of the Gulf of Guinea, an intolerable situation since, even after peace was restored, the Dutch required Portuguese ship captains wishing to trade in the area that they obtain a permit, and they imposed a levy of 10% on their cargo. Consequently, during the last quarter of the 17th century, the Portuguese Crown and the colonial authorities in Brazil and São Tomé and Príncipe had been discussing building a factory on the Costa da Mina, as the Portuguese called the Slave Coast, to supply slaves to the fast-developing sugar and tobacco plantations around Salvador, Bahia in Brazil.

=== Construction of the fort of São João Baptista de Ajudá ===
In 1680, a former governor of São Tomé and Príncipe, Julian de Campo Barretto, had bought Christiansborg Castle, close to the Costa da Mina, from the acting head of the Danish fortress. But following a mutiny by the garrison and the expulsion of Barretto in 1682, Portugal sold it back to Denmark.

In 1680 also, the Prince Regent, the future Pedro II, ordered two ships to build a fortress on the Costa da Mina to "open up trade for the Portuguese", but while the name of the two ships along with their captains are found in documents, there is no evidence that anything was built. The debate over the construction of a trading fort resurfaced in 1698 when, having been informed that the king of Hueda (Ouidah in English) on the Costa da Mina wished to have the Portuguese build a fort on his territory, Lisbon asked the viceroy of Brazil to seek the opinion of the Bahia trading interests about the feasibility of building such a fort. However, since the Bahia traders asked to be granted a twelve-year monopoly of the slave trade along with certain other privileges, the plan was abandoned.

In 1721 the Bahia merchant and shipper interests took advantage of the arrival of a new viceroy, Vasco Fernandes César de Menezes, to force the issue. Their spokesman and instrument was a Captain José Torres who, it was said, knew the Costa da Mina slave trade well and proposed to build a fort at Ajuda (Whydah, Ouidah). As an enticement to immediate action, Torres offered to undertake the work and transport the necessary building materials in his own ship at his own expenses. In 1671 the French had established a small factory there and, with the Hueda king's permission, they replaced it with a fort in 1704. The English Royal African Company followed suit in 1692. The viceroy was aware of these facts and was convinced that it was important "not to miss this occasion" and without waiting for the approval of Lisbon, he authorized Torres to go ahead with his plan. Torres set sail for Ouidah in July 1721 and soon after his arrival a fort was erected by slaves of the Hueda king on a site chosen by him a few hundred yards east of the English fort.

=== Characteristics of the European forts of Ouidah ===
There are three fortresses here, one French, one English and one Portuguese. They are all built according to the same plan. […] At each angle there is an earthen bastion […] each outfitted with twelve iron cannons. Each fort is surrounded by a moat twenty feet wide with the same depth and in which water is rarely found. There is a bridge at the entrance that can easily be lifted in case of an attack. The French fort is the best maintained one while the Portuguese one is in the worst condition. They all have their gunpowder magazines, which are roofed with thatch, at the center of the courtyard.

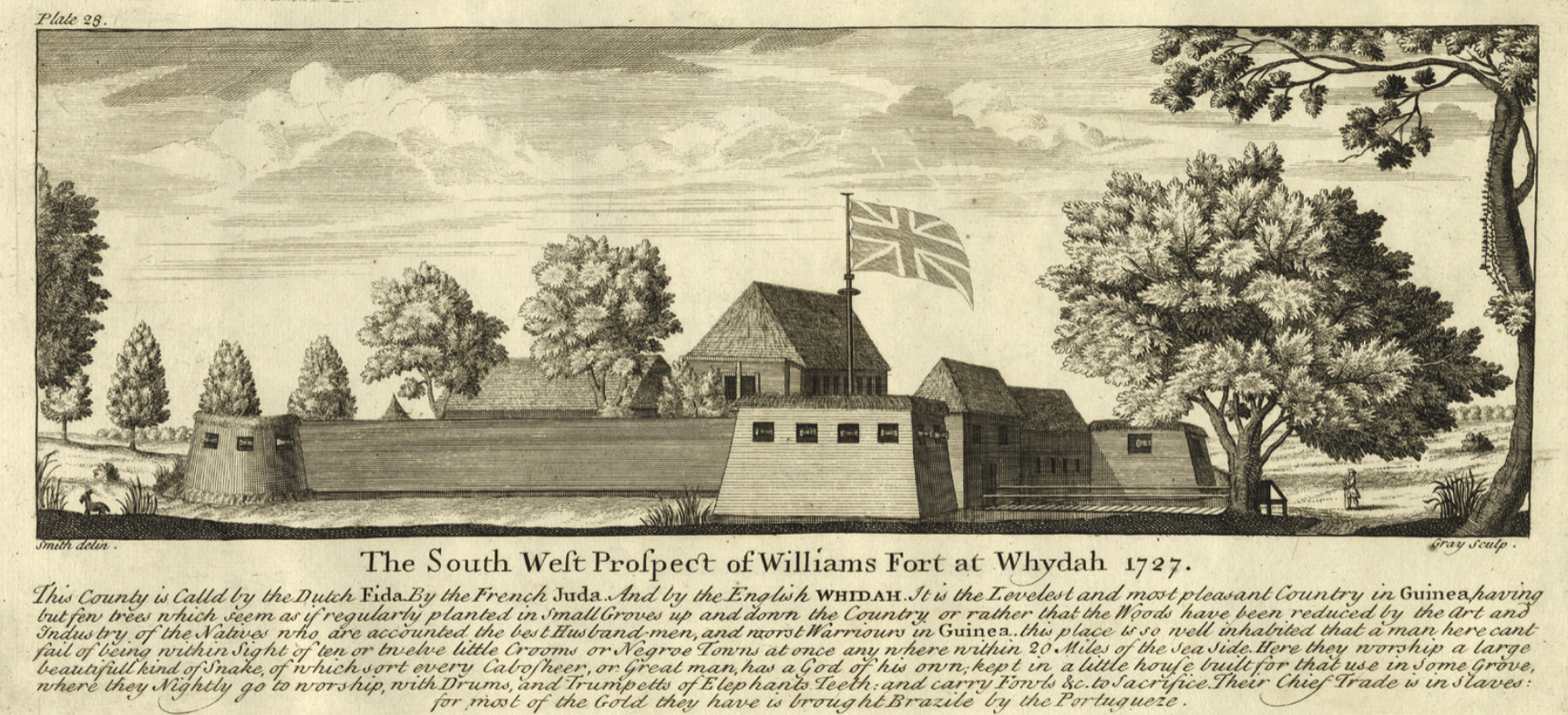
The British fort of Ouidah in 1727

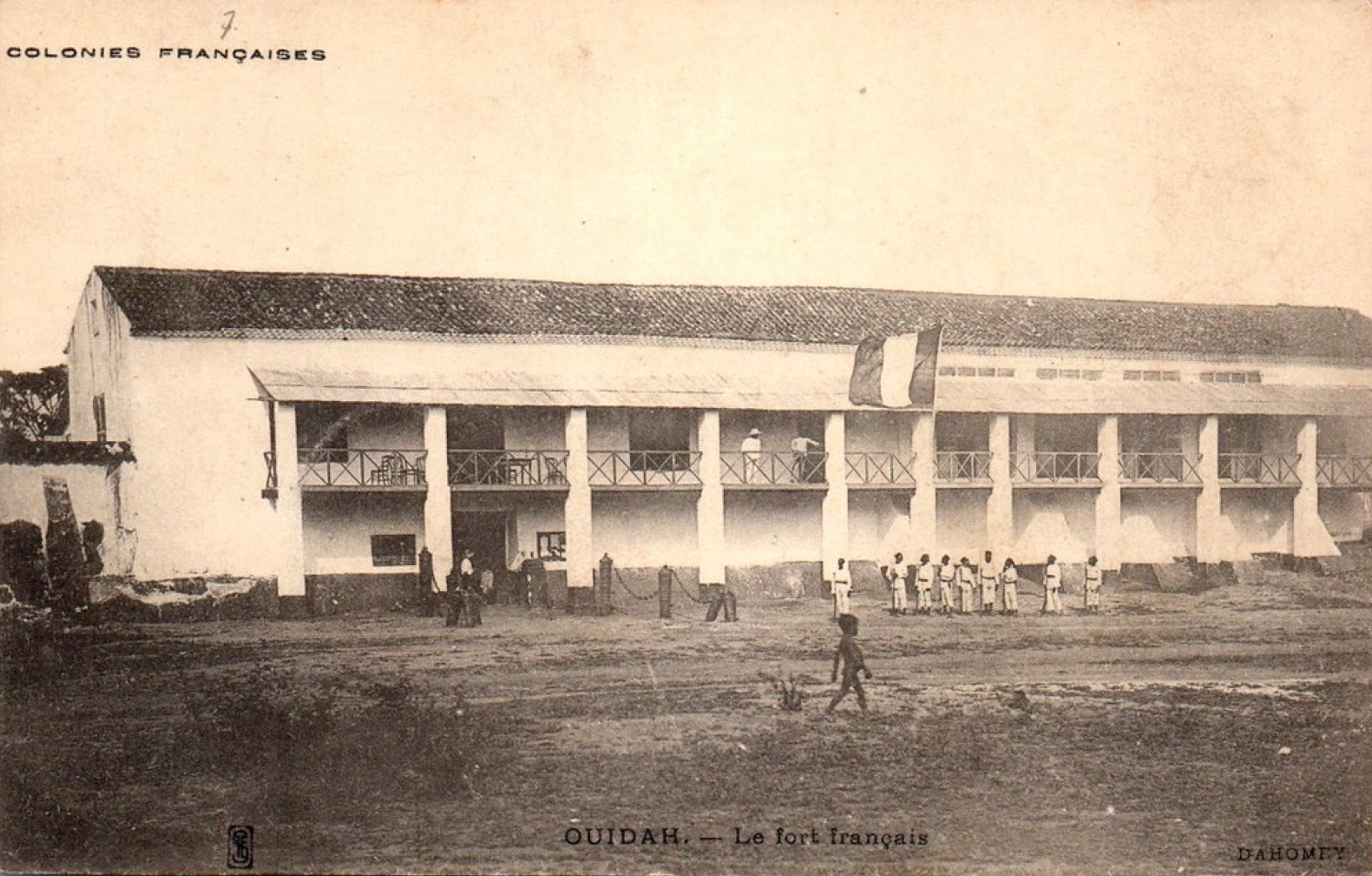
The French fort a few years prior to its demolition in 1908

In contrast to the imposing and militarily stronger fortresses found elsewhere along the West African coast that were built in solid material and roofed with tiles, the British William's Fort, the French Fort Saint-Louis and the Portuguese Forte São João Baptista, roughly 100 meters square each and lying 300 to 500 meters from each other, had been built in dried mud by African labour using local masonry methods. While the 20-feet deep moats, the thickness of the earthen walls – two to three meters – as well as the cannons atop the bastions did represent a respectable defensive potential, they were not built to sustain serious attacks. The fact that the buildings were roofed with thatch made them particularly vulnerable to fire. Earthen fortifications deteriorated quickly and therefore needed constant reconstruction. In the 18th century, it became almost a ritual for a new director to complain about the sorry state in which he found the installations. Given the building material used, it was easy to add or eliminate buildings or modify the shape of the bastions. Eventually, wood and locally made bricks would be used for door frames and to reinforce bastions and gunpowder magazines. Robin Law, the foremost historian of the Slave Coast slave trade referred to the Ouidah forts as "permanently organized fortified factories".

=== Vulnerability of the forts ===
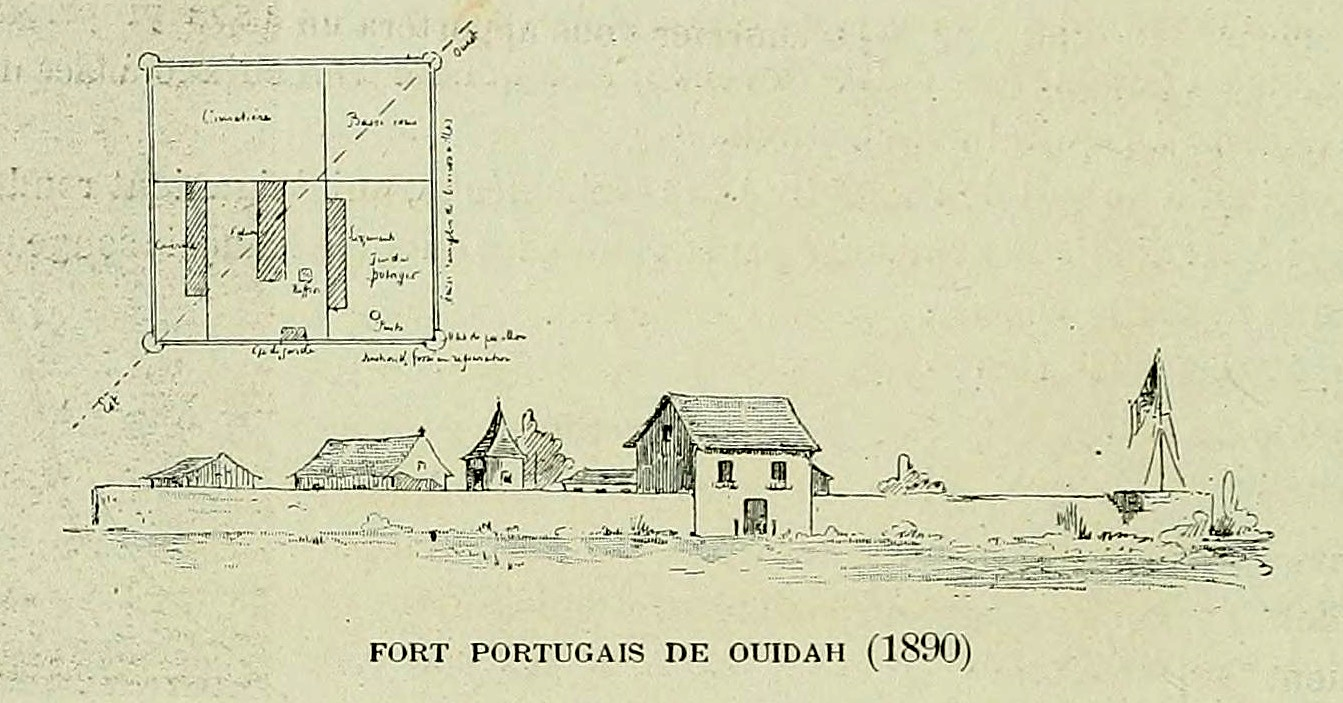
The fort of São João Baptista de Ajudá in 1890

The kings of Hueda, and later Dahomey, did not allow European forts and factories on the seaside. Consequently, the three forts, located about 4 km inland, were particularly vulnerable to "vexations" by the kings and their agents and were dependent on their goodwill. A brief submitted to the British Parliament in the early 18th century lamented that "owning forts drew companies into the expensive complexities of African politics, and required the payment of ground-rents, presents, bribes and loans", and more so in Ouidah. The Portuguese military engineer José António Caldas who stayed at Ouidah around 1759 wrote that due to their being at some distance from the beach, the three forts were "subject to the insults of the king of Dahomey". Each year, the directors of the three forts were required to travel to Abomey, 100 km north of Ouidah, to pay their respect to the king during the annual festivities called "customs". During the troubled years that followed the capture of Ouidah by the king of Dahomey in 1727, all three forts were heavily damaged or destroyed at one time or another, but eventually rebuilt. In 1743, King Tegbesu, suspecting that the director of the Portuguese fort, Joao Basilio, had been conspiring with his enemies, had him imprisoned and expulsed, and the Portuguese fort was destroyed by the explosion of the gunpowder magazine during a subsequent assault by Dahomean troops. During the second half of the 18th century, there was a gradual drift of the slave trade away from Ouidah to points east such Porto Novo, Badagry and Olim (Lagos) largely due to the arbitrariness of the Dahomean kings and their close control over the trade, which was driving up the price of slaves.

=== The Brazilians and the illicit slave trade ===
The legal abolition of the slave trade by Britain, France and Portugal in the early years of the 19th century caused the abandonment or near abandonment of the slave forts. However, starting in the 1830s, British and French trading houses involved in the palm oil export business were allowed to set up their factories in the deserted British and French forts at Ouidah, but the Portuguese fort remained abandoned.

At the time, the Brazilian-born Francisco Félix de Sousa, who had started out as a clerk and storekeeper at the fort, later taking charge of the fort, became a major player in the illicit slave trade thanks in a large measure to Portuguese and Brazilian connivance, as well as the active support of the Dahomean king, traditionally a key player in the slave trade. Having helped a younger brother of the ruling king to gain the throne under the name Ghezo, he was installed by him as "captain of the Whites". His nickname chacha (Portuguese: Xàxà) would from then on be assimilated with the post he, and his sons and grandsons after him, held. Enjoying special privileges with regard to the slave trade, now illegal but nevertheless booming, the chacha, along with three of his sons and other Afro-Brazilian traders, dominated Brazil's trading network on the Slave Coast. In 1822, he is said to have hoisted the flag of the newly proclaimed Brazilian Empire over the fort, which remained largely unoccupied since he conducted his activities and lived with his wives and many dozens of children in another part of Ouidah.

=== Reoccupation of the fort by Portugal ===
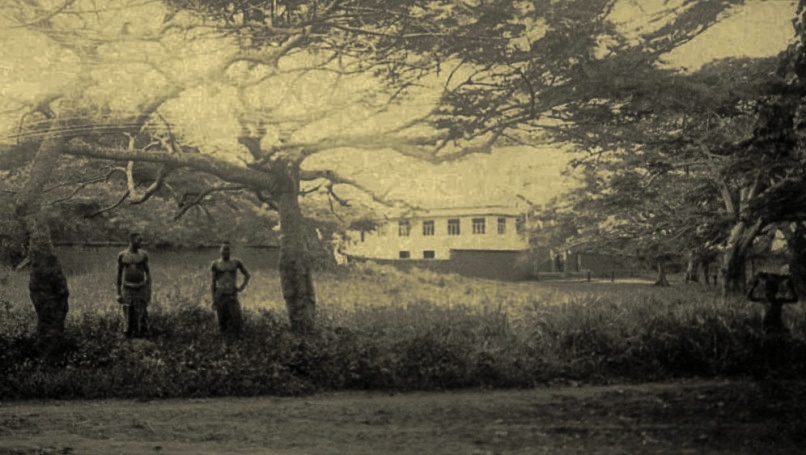
The fort in 1932

The fort was reoccupied by Portugal in 1865. In this period it served as a base for a brief Portuguese attempt to impose a protectorate on the Kingdom of Dahomey of which the city of Hweda (Ajudá – Ouidah) was part (1885–1887).

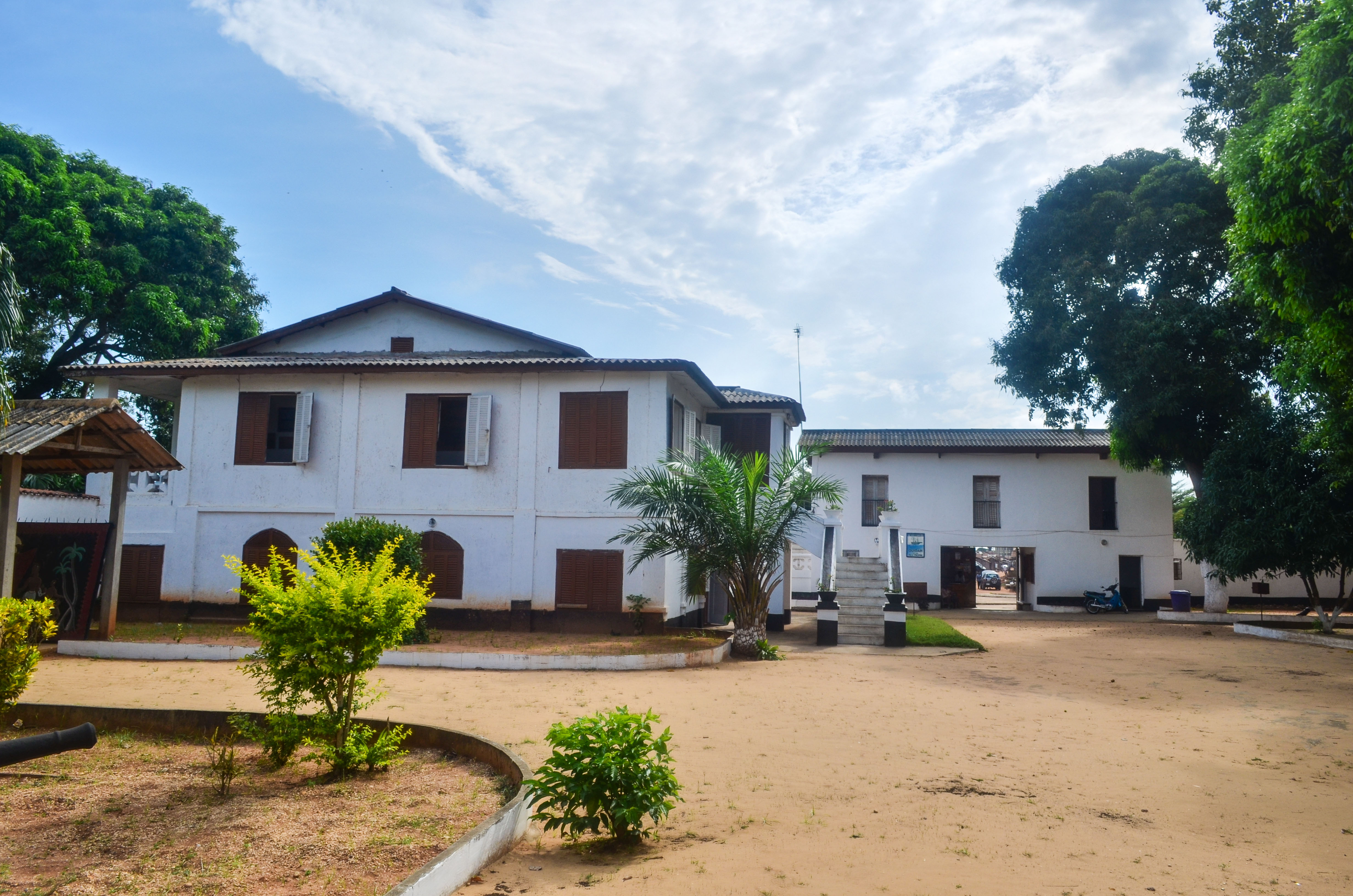
Inside view of the restored fort in 2013. The building on the left is the Ouidah Museum of History, which used to house the Portuguese residente (governor) of the fort

Until its annexation by Dahomey in 1961, exactly one year after Dahomey had gained independence, São João Baptista de Ajudá was probably the world's smallest recognized political unit; according to the census of 1921, it had five inhabitants and, at the moment of the ultimatum by the Dahomey government, only two inhabitants represented Portuguese sovereignty. They tried to burn it rather than surrendering.

In 1965, the symbolic closure of the fort was carried out by the authorities of Dahomey; its premises were subsequently used to house the Ouidah Museum of History, inaugurated on September 6, 1967, under the administration of the Republic of Benin.

Dahomey's annexation of the fort was formally recognized by Portugal in 1985, and restoration and conservation works were carried out in 1987 under the guidance and funding of the Calouste Gulbenkian Foundation, with the project inaugurated on August 10, 1990.

== Design ==
The fort is a small square with towers at its four corners. It comprises a church and officers' quarters. The fort houses a museum.

== Culture ==
Bruce Chatwin’s book The Viceroy of Ouidah (1980) is a fictional retelling of the life of Francisco Félix de Sousa, the De Souza family founder in Benin, and that of his powerful local descendants, dealing also with the subject of the slave trade with Brazil.

The fort is briefly mentioned in Miguel Sousa Tavares's book Equator.

== See also ==
- List of Portuguese colonial forts
- Portuguese Empire
- Ouidah Museum of History
