= Antoinette Tielé Gambia Olou =

Politician in Congo-Brazzaville

Antoinette Tielé Gambia Olou is a Congolese Party of Labour (PCT) politician in Congo-Brazzaville. She is the Deputy for Djiri 1, Brazzaville Department.

Tielé Gambia Olou has been president of the support committee for President Denis Sassou-N'guesso since January 14, 1997. She is a former member of the permanent secretariat of the Union Révolutionnaire des Femmes du Congo (URFC), where she was in charge of women traders and craftsmen. She is on the central committee of the PCT, and is president of the PCT committee for Djiri.

In December 2014 she joined with the Next Generation Foundation to make Christmas food donations to those in need in Djiri. In November 2015 she welcomed PCT Secretary General Pierre Ngolo to a rally to strengthen the party's base vote in Djiri.
