= Godomey =

- Arrondissement and town
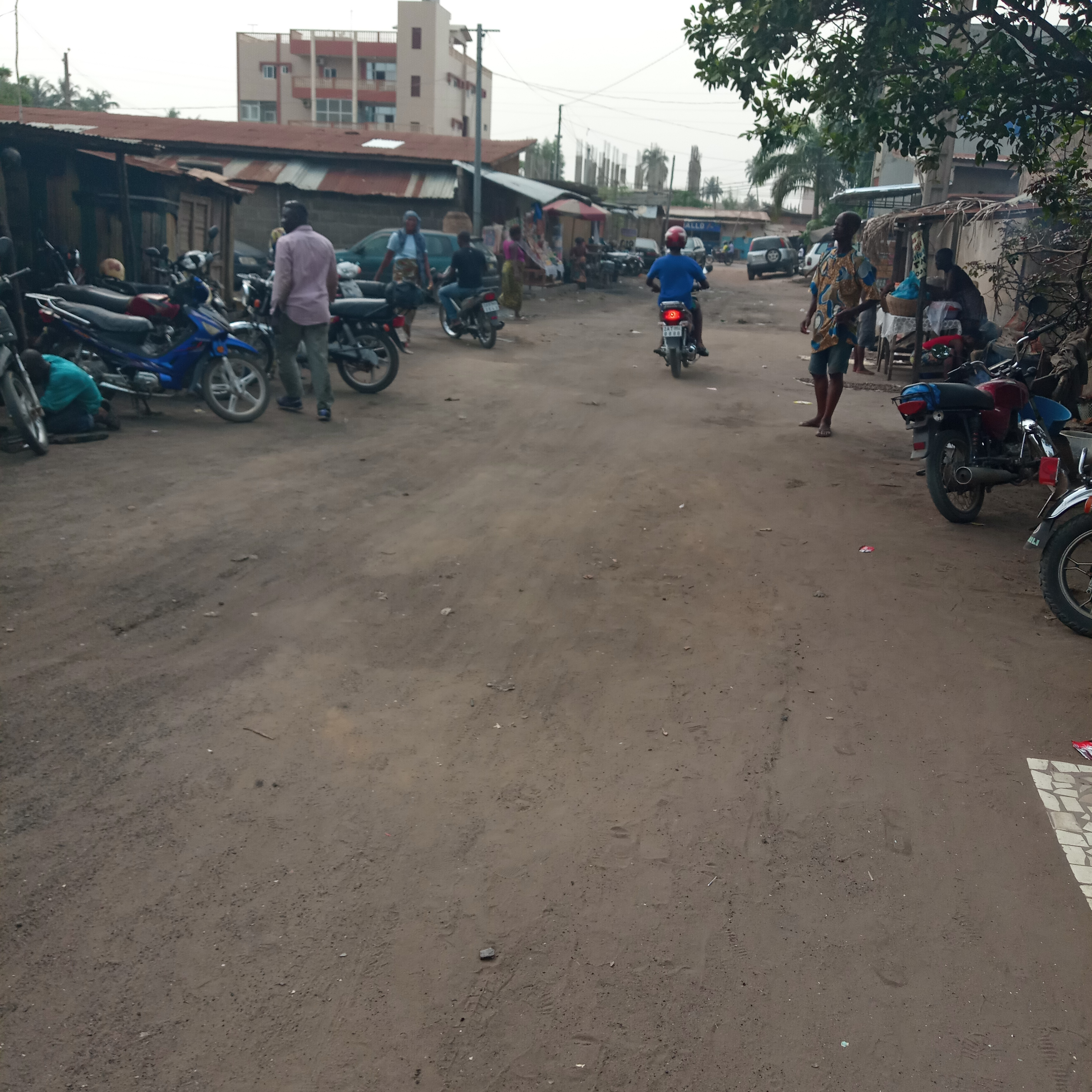
- Road in Godomey (Salamey)

- Location in Benin
- Coordinates: 6°22′N 2°21′E
- Country: Benin
- Department: Atlantique Department
- Commune: Abomey-Calavi

Population (2013 census)
  - Total: 253,262
- Time zone: UTC+1 (WAT)

Godomey is a town and arrondissement in the Atlantique Department of southern Benin. It is an administrative division under the jurisdiction of the commune of Abomey-Calavi. According to the population census conducted by the Institut National de la Statistique Benin on March 11, 2013, the arrondissement had a total population of 253,262.

CEG Godomey is a public secondary school located in Godomey.

Godomey used to be known as Jakin.

== Notable people ==
- Amdivie Kouhounha (born 2001), gymnast
