= Savi =

Historic capital of the Kingdom of Whydah, West Africa

- Arrondissement and town
- Interactive map of Savi
- Coordinates: 6.3861°N 2.1058°E
- Country: Benin
- Department: Atlantique Department
- Commune: Ouidah

Population (2002)
  - Total: 6,949
- Time zone: UTC+1 (WAT)

Savi is a town and arrondissement in the Atlantique Department of southern Benin. It is an administrative division under the jurisdiction of the commune of Ouidah. According to the population census conducted by the Institut National de la Statistique Benin on February 15, 2002, the arrondissement had a total population of 6949. It was previously the capital of the Kingdom of Whydah.

== History ==
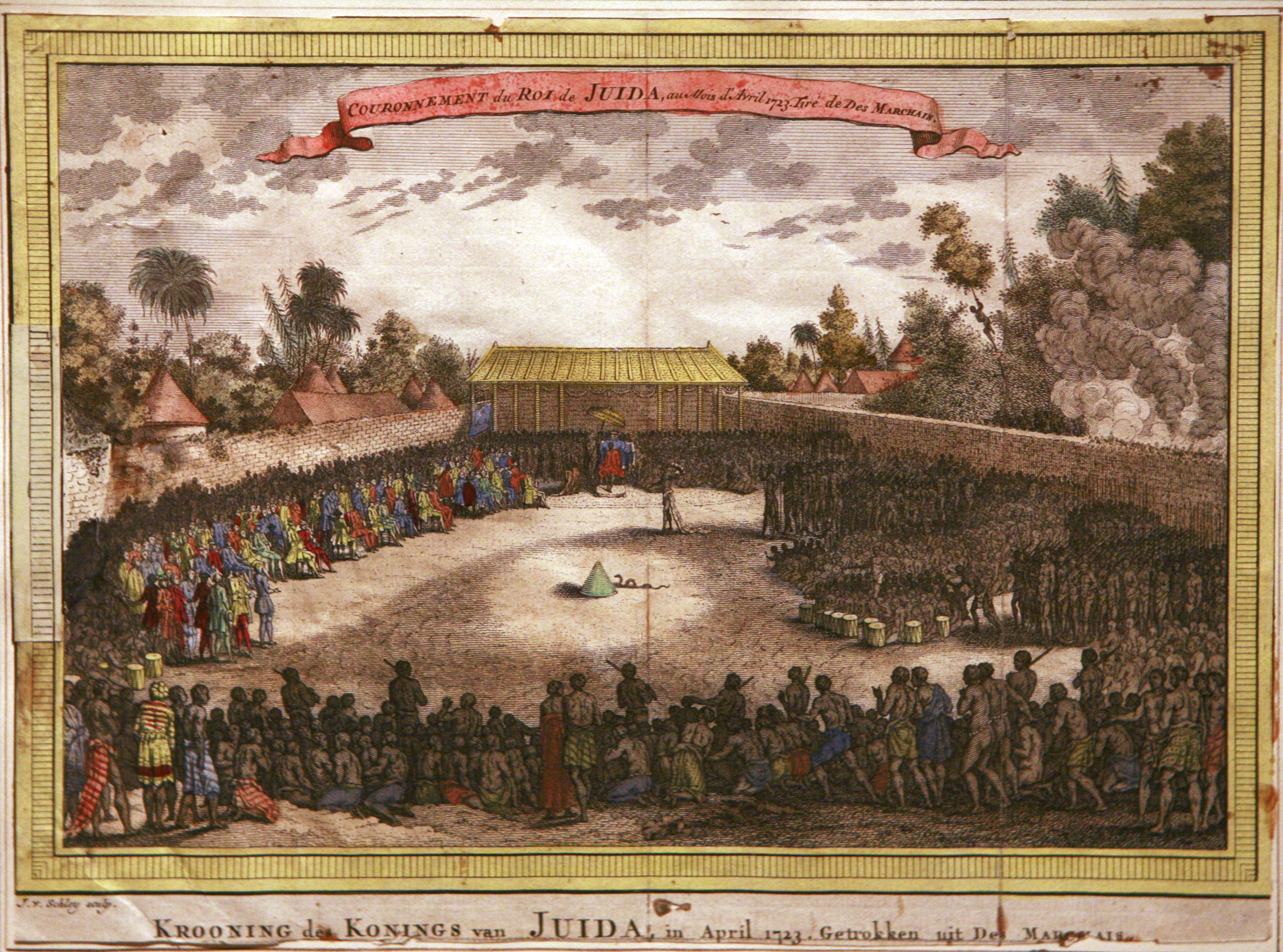
Crowning of the King of Juida (Whydah) in Savi in 1725

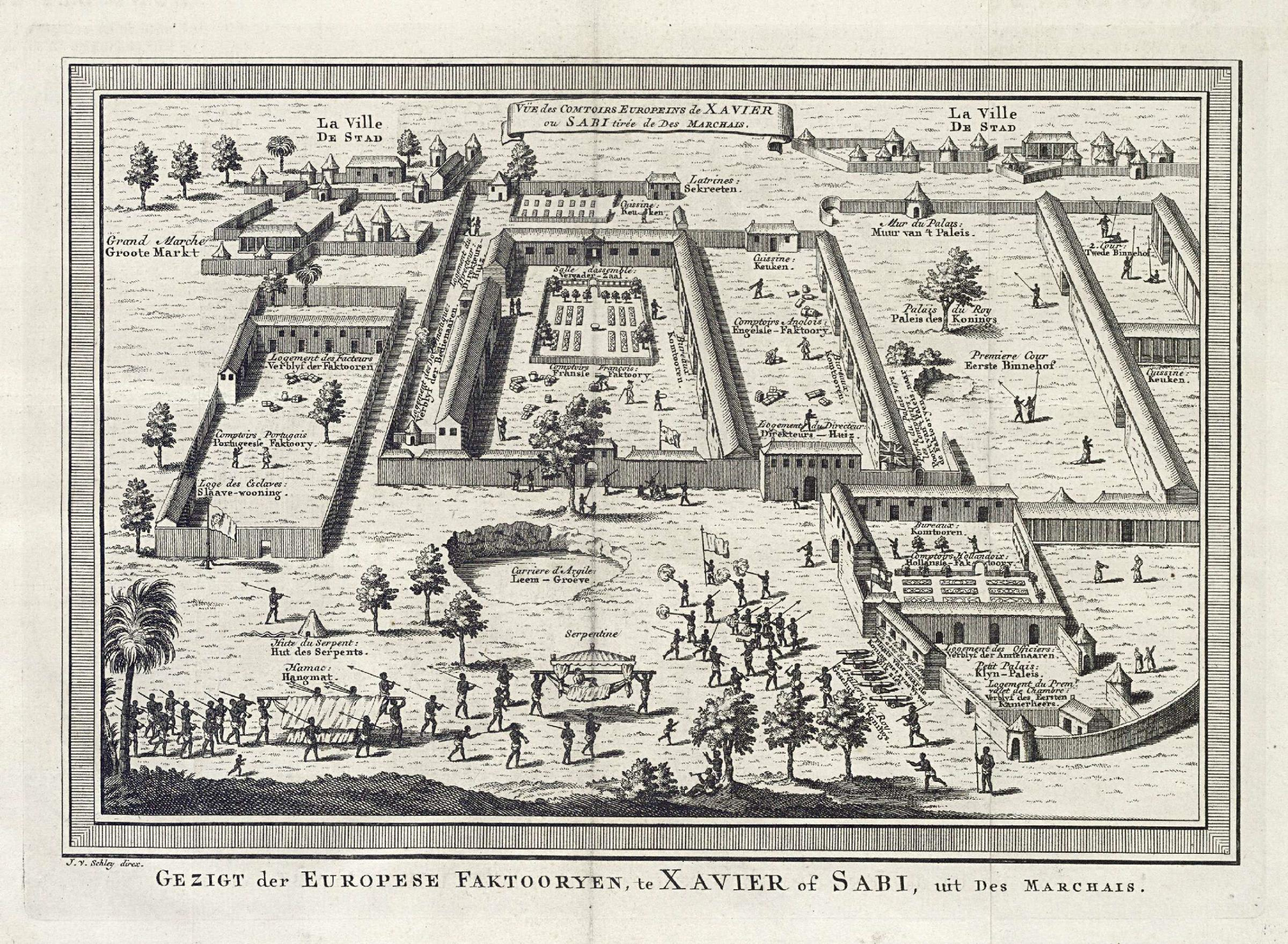
The European factories in Savi

Savi was the capital of the Kingdom of Whydah prior to its capture by the forces of Dahomey in 1727.

An account of the city was given by Robert Norris in 1789:

Sabee, at that period the metropolis of the kingdom, the residence of their monarch, and seat of their commerce, was more than four miles in circumference. The houses, constructed with mud walls, were roofed with thatch. The factory houses of the European traders were spacious and airy, distributed into convenient apartments, and surrounded on the outside with a large gallery opening into balconies. The town swarmed with people, insomuch, that it was impossible to pass through the streets without great difficulty. Markets were held every day, at which were exposed to sale all sorts of merchandizes, European and African, besides abundance of provisions of every kind.

There were British, French, Dutch and Portuguese factories in the city, adjacent to the Royal Palace. They were essentially involved in the slave trade.
