= Ouidah =

Ouidah Glexwe Whydah
- Commune and city
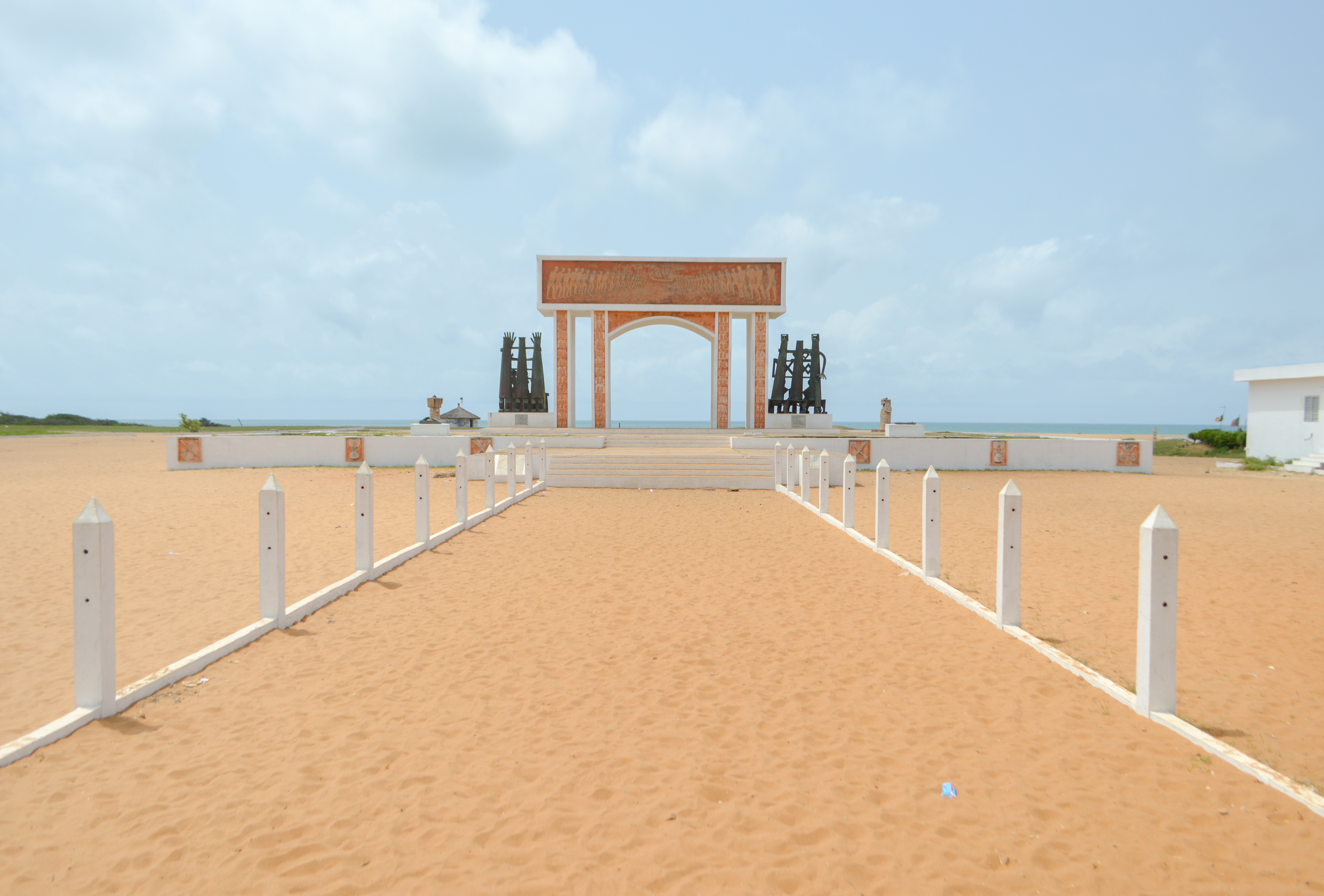
- Door of No Return, memorial to victims of the Atlantic slave trade

- Location in Benin
- Coordinates: 6°22′N 2°05′E
- Country: Benin
- Department: Atlantique Department

Area
  - Total: 364 km^{2} (141 sq mi)
- Elevation: 65 m (213 ft)

Population (2012)
  - Total: 91,688
  - Density: 252/km^{2} (652/sq mi)
- Time zone: UTC+1 (WAT)

Ouidah (English: /ˈwiːdə/; French: [wi.da]) or Whydah (/ˈhwɪdə, -ɔː/; Ouidah, Juida, and Juda by the French; Ajudá by the Portuguese; and Fida by the Dutch), and known locally as Glexwe, formerly the chief port of the Kingdom of Whydah, is a city on the coast of the Republic of Benin. The commune covers an area of 364 km^{2} (141 sq mi) and as of 2002 had a population of 76,555 people.

== History ==
In local tradition Kpassa is supposed to have founded the town. This probably happened towards the end of the sixteenth century. The town was originally known as Glēxwé, literally 'Farmhouse', and was part of the Kingdom of Whydah.

Ouidah saw its role in international trade rise when the Royal African Company (RAC) constructed a fort there in 1650.

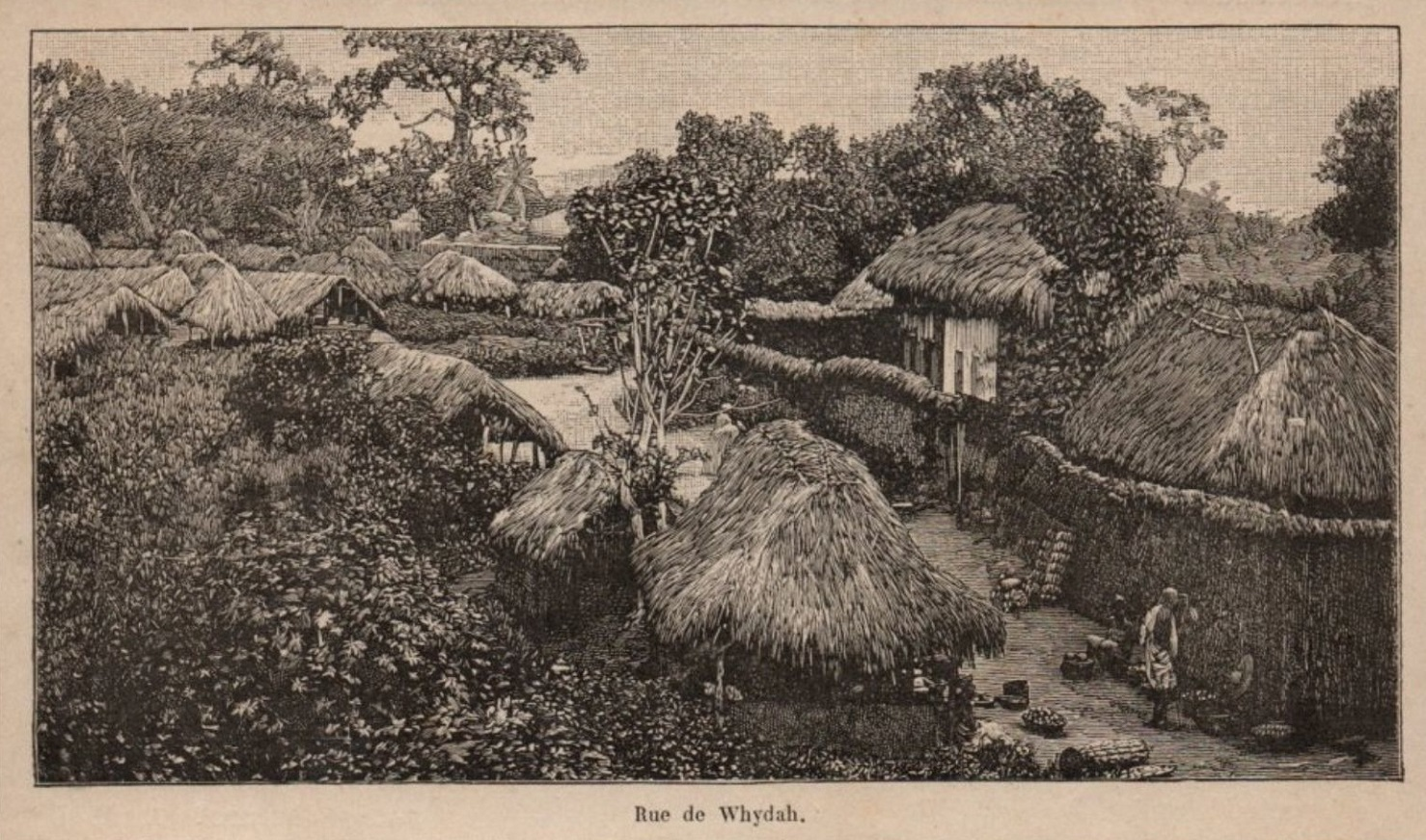
A street of Ouidah in 1892

Whydah troops pushed their way into the African interior, capturing millions of people through wars, and selling them to European and Arab slave traders. Brandenburg established some forts between the years 1682 and 1700, alongside the English (British after 1707) and Dutch. By 1716, the Kingdom of Whydah had become the second largest slave port in the triangular trade, as noted by the crew of the slave ship Whydah Gally when it arrived to purchase 500 slaves from King Haffon to sell in Jamaica.

The Kingdom was ruled by King Haffon, who received his coronation crown as a gift from Portugal, until, in 1727, the Kingdom of Whydah was captured by the forces of King Agaja of Dahomey. On 19 March 1727, The Boston News-Letter gave this report:

WHYDAH IN AFRICA: the beginning of this month, Agaja the king of Dahomey came down unexpectedly with an army, and soon became master of this place, and the country adjacent Allada; the desolation which ensued was so great, that it is impossible to be represented! The factory at Saber, once the king's town and Seat of Trade, was burnt to the ground, and in it a great quantity of merchandise. Forty Europeans were carried into captivity, to the King of Dahomey's camp at Ardrah, but after having been detained about 14 days, seven of them were released and are now returning hither; they gave a melancholy account of their treatment. This country, which was the pleasantest in all these parts, is now laid waste by fire and sword, and made a wilderness!

In 1860, Whydah was the port that sent the last recorded shipment of slaves to the United States, even though that country had prohibited the transatlantic slave trade in 1808. This illegal shipment was aboard the Clotilda and went to Mobile, Alabama. The last shipment of slaves to Spanish Cuba occurred as late as 1873.

France captured the town in 1894, by which time the town had declined due to the outlawing of the slave trade. In the time frame of 1946–1949 French government estimates put the population of Ouidah at about 14,600. By then it had a railway. It was a centre for production and trade in palm kernels, palm oil, copra, coffee, manioc, beans, tomatoes and onions. It was also a centre of the fish trade and the manufacture of vegetable oil. It had Catholic, Protestant and Muslim places of worship.

European involvement in West Africa differed between the Slave Coast and the Gold Coast. In contrast to the grand forts of the Gold Coast, William's Fort at Ouidah (ex-Slave Coast) stood as a testimonial to the slave trade.

Today, Ouidah is economically peripheral, and 'cultural tourism' based on the slave trade is less successful. Unlike true ports, Ouidah was inland. Slaves and goods were transported along the "slave route" to the beach for embarkation. Ships couldn't approach due to sandbars and used canoes for communication (common on both the Slave Coast and the Gold Coast).

=== Fort of São João Baptista de Ajudá ===
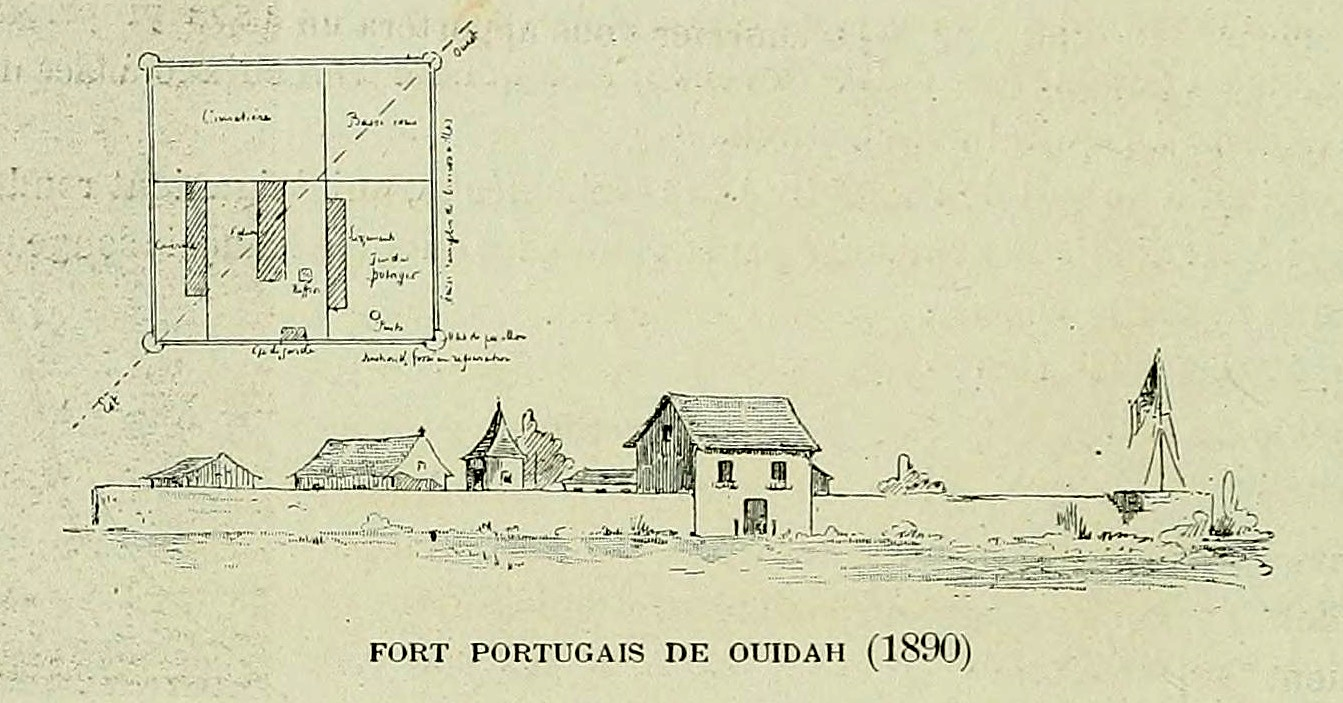
Fort of São João Baptista de Ajudá in 1890

The Fort of São João Baptista de Ajudá (in English Fort of St John the Baptist of Ouidah) is a small fortress built by the Portuguese in Ouidah on the coast of Dahomey (originally Ajudá, from Hweda, on the Atlantic coast of modern Benin), reached by the Portuguese in 1580, after which it grew around the slave trade, for which the Slave Coast was already renowned. In 1680 the Portuguese governor of São Tomé and Príncipe was authorized to erect a fort but nothing was done and it was only in 1721 that construction of the fort, which was named Fort of São João Baptista de Ajudá, started. The fort, built on land given to Portugal by King Haffon of Whydah, remained under Portuguese control from 1721 until 1961.

=== William's Fort ===
==== Introduction ====
Ouidah's importance arose from the fact that several European powers (French, Portuguese, English) competed for influence, weakening their overall authority. The British presence peaked at the height of the slave trade (1680s-1710s) before shifting focus. The 1830s saw a switch to palm oil, dominated by French companies. This coincided with Ouidah's decline compared to Cotonou's better port access that French colonial rule consolidated.

==== William's Fort ====
William's Fort began as a modest English trading post in the late 17th century, named after King William III and initially fortified during his reign (1689–1702). The English presence in Ouidah predates the fort, with the Royal African Company suffering initial setbacks before securing a permanent factory in 1684, with guns often only used for salutes.

Built of mud and straw, early fortifications were simple, with cannons probably used for signal purposes rather than combat. Tensions with the French factory culminated in an exchange of fire in 1692, prompting the English to build proper fortifications. Historical documents later describe the fort as an important slave trading facility.

Despite being deserted by the British in 1812, the fort had a surprisingly large populace. The British attempted to reoccupy it with a vice-consulate, but encountered difficulties. Missionaries from the English Wesleyan Methodist Missionary Society took up residence for a time and even built a chapel. The fort then returned to the commercial sphere, with various trading companies controlling it. Interestingly, it was even under French control during the First World War. The local area around the fort still reflects its British past with names like "The English Fort" and a shop named after the last British resident.

==== Limited local power ====
Unlike their counterparts on the Gold Coast, the European forts in Ouidah, including William's Fort, lacked real authority. They couldn't compete militarily with local rulers and deferred to them, first in Hueda and then in Dahomey. This was very unlike the Gold Coast forts, such as Cape Coast Castle, which eventually evolved into full colonies. At William's Fort, abandoned by the British in 1812, French reconstruction relied on private enterprise rather than government intervention).

The key difference was one of legal authority. European forts, even large ones, weren't sovereign entities in West Africa. They remained under African control, essentially acting as 'tenants' with limited powers, paying rent to local rulers. The European presence in Ouidah, particularly at William's Fort, was particularly weak. The Dahomians saw the European governors as part of their own system, not as independent rulers. This is reflected in the king's expectation of their attendance at feasts and the way they were treated on death, which mirrored Dahomian officials.

==== A microcosm of Ouidah society ====
The European forts in Ouidah, especially William's Fort with its extensive records, offer a unique perspective on the social and economic life of the city. These records document interactions with the local community, particularly those employed by the fort (both enslaved and free Africans) and those providing various services. William's Fort itself functioned as a commercial centre, relying on local currency and outside suppliers. Historians can use these records, including wages and prices, to trace economic trends within Ouidah.

Despite the European influence, William's Fort relied heavily on African labour. The population surrounding the fort, Sogbadji, mirrored the diverse ethnic mix of Ouidah. Enslaved Africans often came from distant regions, making escape attempts less likely, while temporary workers from places such as the Gold Coast sometimes settled permanently. This diverse population is still evident in Sogbadji families today. Some trace their roots back to the 19th century, while others claim to be the original inhabitants

Integration went beyond ethnicity. The Lemon family, as an example, descended from a fort soldier who married locally, were even appointed royal guards by the Dahomian kings. Similarly, the Midjrokan family descended from the fort's 18th-century linguist, whose descendants inherited the role. Even families such as the Kocus, who are canoeists, trace their lineage back to an 18th-century Gold Coast boatswain.

Religious practices at William's Fort also reflected this integration. Unlike other European forts with on-site chaplains, William's Fort appears to have adopted local customs. Historical accounts mention a shrine dedicated to the 'king's fetish Mawoo', the god of creation, existing within the fort itself. This wasn't a recent development, as 18th century records mention a shrine within the fort dedicated to a local goddess. The presence of this shrine, believed to be responsible for the fort's invincibility, further underlines the assimilation that took place.

This assimilation is also evident in the way the Dahomians treated the tombs of the deceased English governors buried inside the fort. The king of Hueda sent a "fetishman" to make offerings at the grave of one such governor, believing that his spirit was calling his successor to the afterlife. Centuries later, the Dahomian king sent priests to perform rites in the forts, including ceremonies over the graves in the English fort, despite the protests of the resident British official. These examples demonstrate the deep social and religious integration that existed within the William's Fort community.

== Population ==
The population evolution of Ouidah is as follows:

Year	Population
1979	25 459
1992	64 433
2002	77 832
2008 (estimate)	90 042

== Notable landmarks ==
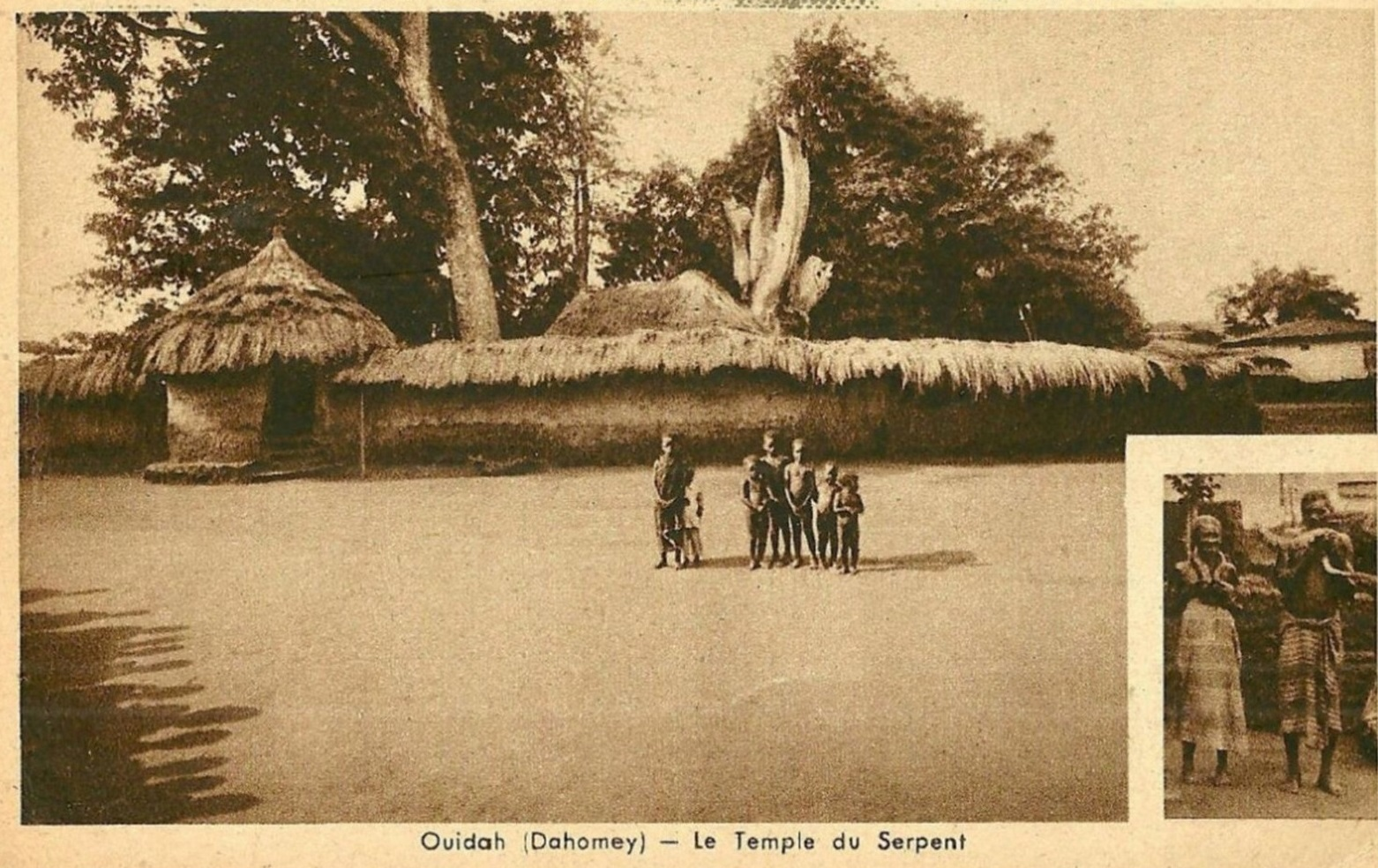
The Temple of the Pythons circa 1900. The temple was the main religious building of pre-colonial Ouidah.

Attractions in Ouidah include a restored mansion of Brazilian slavers (the Maison du Brésil), a Vodun python temple, an early twentieth century basilica and the Sacred Forest of Kpasse, dotted with bronze statues.

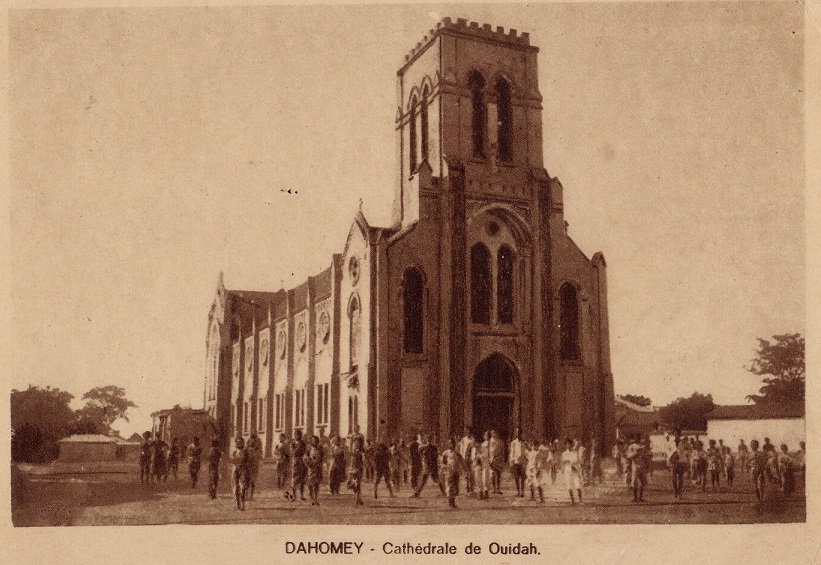
The Basilica of Ouidah in 1910. Construction began in 1903 and was completed in 1909.

The Route des Esclaves, by which slaves were taken to the beach, has numerous statues and monuments, including the Door of No Return, a memorial arch.

The Market Center of Ouidah, which was established by Scouts more than 20 years ago, trains young people in agricultural skills, thus helping to reverse the exodus towards the cities.

Ouidah is often considered the spiritual capital of the Vodun religion, and hosts an annual international Vodun conference.

Other landmarks include:

- Basilique de l'Immaculée Conception
- Ouidah Museum of History
- Zinsou Foundation Museum

== World Heritage Status ==
This site was added to the UNESCO World Heritage Tentative List on 31 October 1996 in the Cultural category.

== Notable people ==
- Cudjoe Lewis (d. 1935), Redoshi (d. 1937), and Matilda McCrear (d, 1940), last known survivors of the Transatlantic slave trade.
- Patrice Talon (1958), president of Benin
- Angélique Kidjo (1960), singer
- Oscar Olou (1987), footballer

== See also ==
- Heads of State of Benin
- Heads of Government of Benin
- Savi, a commune in Ouidah formerly the regional capital
- Whydah Gally
