= Ajaland =

Ajaland is the area inhabited by the Aja people in Benin and Togo, West Africa. In the late 16th and early 17th centuries, this area was a major center of the Atlantic Slave Trade. It was largely split between the Kingdom of Whydah and the domain of the ruler of Allada. However, as David Ross has argued, the kings of these domains did not control the whole area, but shared their domains with many other rulers who controlled quite limited domains.
