= Cantons of Togo =

Third-level administrative units of Togo

The cantons of Togo are the third-level administrative units of the country, after regions and prefectures; which in turn they are subdivided into villages. They are similar to communes or sub-districts or sub-prefectures of other French African nations.

As of 2013 there were 387 cantons, grouped within 35 prefectures. However, as of May 2019, there are 394 cantons, grouped within 39 prefectures.

== Centrale Region ==
- 05 Prefectures; 61 Cantons

=== Blitta Prefecture ===
- Capital: Blitta–Gare; 21 Cantons
1. Canton of Blitta–Gare
2. Canton of Agbandi
3. Canton of Atchintsé
4. Canton of Blitta–Village
5. Canton of Diguengué
6. Canton of Dikpéléou
7. Canton of Doufouli
8. Canton of Katchenké
9. Canton of Koffiti
10. Canton of Langabou
11. Canton of M’Poti
12. Canton of Pagala–Gare
13. Canton of Pagala–Village
14. Canton of Tchaloudè
15. Canton of Tcharé–Baou
16. Canton of Tchifama
17. Canton of Tintchro
18. Canton of Waragni
19. Canton of Welly
20. Canton of Yaloumbé
21. Canton of Yégué

=== Mô Prefecture ===
- Capital: Djarkpanga; 05 Cantons
1. Canton of Djarkpanga
2. Canton of Boulohou
3. Canton of Kagnigbara
4. Canton of Saïboudè
5. Canton of Tindjassi

=== Sotouboua Prefecture ===
- Capital: Sotouboua; 12 Cantons
1. Canton of Sotouboua
2. Canton of Adjengré
3. Canton of Aouda
4. Canton of Bodjondé
5. Canton of Fazao
6. Canton of Kaniamboua
7. Canton of Kazaboua
8. Canton of Sassaro
9. Canton of Tabindè
10. Canton of Tchébébé
11. Canton of Titigbé
12. Canton of Kériadè

=== Tchamba Prefecture ===
- Capital: Tchamba; 10 Cantons
1. Canton of Tchamba
2. Canton of Adjéidè (Kri–Kri)
3. Canton of Affem
4. Canton of Alibi
5. Canton of Bago
6. Canton of Balanka
7. Canton of Goubi
8. Canton of Kaboli
9. Canton of Koussountou
10. Canton of Larini

=== Tchaoudjo Prefecture ===
- Capital: Sokode; 13 Cantons
1. Canton of Komah
2. Canton of Agoulou
3. Canton of Aléhéridè
4. Canton of Amaïdè
5. Canton of Kadambara
6. Canton of Kéméni
7. Canton of Kolina
8. Canton of Kpangalam
9. Canton of Kparatao
10. Canton of Kpassouadè
11. Canton of Lama–Tessi
12. Canton of Tchalo
13. Canton of Wassarabo

== Kara Region ==
- 07 Prefectures; 75 Cantons

=== Assoli Prefecture ===
- Capital: Bafilo; 06 Cantons
1. Canton of Bafilo
2. Canton of Alédjo
3. Canton of Bouladè
4. Canton of Dako
5. Canton of Koumondè
6. Canton of Soudou

=== Bassar Prefecture ===
- Capital: Bassar; 10 Cantons
1. Canton of Bassar
2. Canton of Baghan
3. Canton of Bangéli
4. Canton of Bitchabé
5. Canton of Dimouri
6. Canton of Kabou
7. Canton of Kalanga
8. Canton of Manga
9. Canton of Sanda–Afowou
10. Canton of Sanda–Kagbanda

=== Binah Prefecture ===
- Capital: Pagouda; 09 Cantons
1. Canton of Pagouda
2. Canton of Boufalé
3. Canton of Kémérida
4. Canton of Kétao
5. Canton of Lama–Dessi
6. Canton of Pessaré
7. Canton of Pitikita
8. Canton of Sirka
9. Canton of Solla

=== Dankpen Prefecture ===
- Capital: Guérin–Kouka; 12 Cantons
1. Canton of Guérin–Kouka
2. Canton of Bapuré
3. Canton of Katchamba
4. Canton of Kidjaboum
5. Canton of Koulfièkou
6. Canton of Koutchichéou
7. Canton of Namon
8. Canton of Nampoch
9. Canton of Nandouta
10. Canton of Natchiboré
11. Canton of Natchitikpi
12. Canton of Nawaré

=== Doufelgou Prefecture ===
- Capital: Niamtougou; 14 Cantons
1. Canton of Niamtougou
2. Canton of Agbandé–Yaka
3. Canton of Alloum
4. Canton of Baga
5. Canton of Défalé
6. Canton of Kadjalla
7. Canton of Koka
8. Canton of Kpaha
9. Canton of Léon
10. Canton of Massédéna
11. Canton of Pouda
12. Canton of Siou
13. Canton of Tchoré
14. Canton of Ténéga

=== Kéran Prefecture ===
- Capital: Kéran; 09 Cantons
1. Canton of Kantè
2. Canton of Akponté
3. Canton of Atalotè
4. Canton of Hélota
5. Canton of Ossacré
6. Canton of Pessidè
7. Canton of Tamberma–Est (Koutougou)
8. Canton of Tamberma–Ouest (Nadoba)
9. Canton of Warengo

=== Kozah Prefecture ===
- Capital: Kara; 15 Cantons
1. Canton of Lama-Kara (Kara)
2. Canton of Atchangbadè
3. Canton of Awandjélo
4. Canton of Bohou
5. Canton of Djamdè
6. Canton of Kouméa
7. Canton of Landa
8. Canton of Landa–Kpinzindè
9. Canton of Lassa
10. Canton of Pya
11. Canton of Sarakawa
12. Canton of Soumdina
13. Canton of Tcharé
14. Canton of Tchitchao
15. Canton of Yadé

== Maritime Region ==
- 08 Prefectures; 74 Cantons

=== Avé Prefecture ===
- Capital: Kévé; 09 Cantons
1. Canton of Kévé
2. Canton of Aképé
3. Canton of Ando
4. Canton of Assahoun
5. Canton of Badja
6. Canton of Noépé
7. Canton of Tovégan
8. Canton of Zolo
9. Canton of Edji

=== Bas-Mono Prefecture ===
- Capital: Afagnagan; 07 Cantons
1. Canton of Afagnagan
2. Canton of Afagnan–Gbléta
3. Canton of Agbétiko
4. Canton of Agomé–Glouzou
5. Canton of Attitogon
6. Canton of Hompou
7. Canton of Kpétsou

=== Agoé–Nyivé Prefecture ===
- Capital: Agoé–Nyivé; 6 Cantons
1. Canton of Agoè–Nyivé
2. Canton of Adétikopé^{Zio}
3. Canton of Légbassito
4. Canton of Sanguéra
5. Canton of Togblékopé
6. Canton of Vakpossito

=== Golfe Prefecture ===
- Capital: Lome; 5 Cantons
1. Canton of Amoutivé
2. Canton of Aflao–Gakli
3. Canton of Aflao–Sagbado
4. Canton of Baguida
5. Canton of Bè

=== Lacs Prefecture ===
- Capital: Aného; 09 Cantons
1. Ville of Aného (Adjigo)
2. Ville of Aného (Lawson)
3. Canton of Agbodrafo
4. Canton of Agouègan
5. Canton of Aklakou
6. Canton of Anfoin
7. Canton of Fiata
8. Canton of Ganavé
9. Canton of Glidji

=== Vo Prefecture ===
- Capital: Vogan; 10 Cantons
1. Canton of Vogan
2. Canton of Akoumapé
3. Canton of Anyronkopé
4. Canton of Dagbati
5. Canton of Dzrékpo
6. Canton of Hahotoé
7. Canton of Momé–Hounkpati
8. Canton of Sévagan
9. Canton of Togoville
10. Canton of Vo–Koutimé

=== Yoto Prefecture ===
- Capital: Tabligbo; 12 Cantons
1. Canton of Tabligbo
2. Canton of Ahépé
3. Canton of Amoussimé
4. Canton of Essè–Godjin
5. Canton of Gboto
6. Canton of Kini–Kondji
7. Canton of Kouvé
8. Canton of Sédomé
9. Canton of Tchêkpo
10. Canton of Tokpli
11. Canton of Tométy–Kondji
12. Canton of Zafi

=== Zio Prefecture ===
- Capital: Tsevie; 16 Cantons
1. Canton of Tsévié
2. Canton of Abobo
3. Canton of Agbélouvé
4. Canton of Bolou
5. Canton of Dalavé
6. Canton of Davié
7. Canton of Djagblé
8. Canton of Gamé–Sèva
9. Canton of Gapé–Centre
10. Canton of Gapé–Kpodji
11. Canton of Gbatopé
12. Canton of Gblainvié
13. Canton of Kovié
14. Canton of Kpomé
15. Canton of Mission–Tové
16. Canton of Wli

== Plateaux Region ==
- 12 Prefectures; 113 Cantons

=== Agou Prefecture ===
- Capital: Agou–Gadjepe; 13 Cantons
1. Canton of Agou–Tavié: (Reine Mère of village of Agou–Koumawou)
2. Canton of Agotimé–Nord
3. Canton of Agotimé–Sud
4. Canton of Agou–Akplolo
5. Canton of Agou–Atigbé
6. Canton of Agou–Iboè
7. Canton of Agou–Kébo
8. Canton of Agou–Nyogbo
9. Canton of Agou–Nyogbo–Agbétiko
10. Canton of Amoussoukopé
11. Canton of Assahoun–Fiagbé
12. Canton of Gadja
13. Canton of Kati

=== Akébou Prefecture ===
- Capital: Kougnohou; 08 Cantons
1. Canton of Kougnohou (Akébou)
2. Canton of Djon
3. Canton of Gbendé
4. Canton of Kamina–Akébou
5. Canton of Kpalavé
6. Canton of Sérégbéné
7. Canton of Vèh
8. Canton of Yalla

=== Amou Prefecture ===
- Capital: Amlamé; 14 Cantons
1. Canton of Ouma (Amlamé)
2. Canton of Adiva
3. Canton of Amou–Oblo
4. Canton of Avédji–Itadi
5. Canton of Ekpégnon
6. Canton of Evou
7. Canton of Gamé
8. Canton of Hihéatro
9. Canton of Ikponou (Akposso–Nord) Otadi
10. Canton of Imlé
11. Canton of Kpatégan
12. Canton of Logbo (Témédja)
13. Canton of Okpahoé
14. Canton of Sodo

=== Anié Prefecture ===
- Capital: Anié; 06 Cantons
1. Canton of Anié
2. Canton of Adogbénou
3. Canton of Atchinèdji
4. Canton of Glitto
5. Canton of Kolo–Kopé
6. Canton of Pallakoko

=== Danyi Prefecture ===
- Capital: Danyi–Apeyeme; 06 Cantons
1. Canton of Danyi–Atigba
2. Canton of Ahlon
3. Canton of Danyi–Elavagnon
4. Canton of Danyi–Kakpa
5. Canton of Danyi–Kpéto–Evita
6. Canton of Yikpa

=== Est-Mono Prefecture ===
- Capital: Elavagnon; 07 Cantons
1. Canton of Elavagnon
2. Canton of Badin–Copé
3. Canton of Gbadjahè
4. Canton of Kamina
5. Canton of Kpéssi
6. Canton of Morétan–Igbérioko
7. Canton of Nyamassila

=== Haho Prefecture ===
- Capital: Notsé; 10 Cantons
1. Canton of Notsé
2. Canton of Assrama
3. Canton of Atsavé
4. Canton of Ayito (Kpégnon–Adja)
5. Canton of Dalia
6. Canton of Djéméni
7. Canton of Kpédomé
8. Canton of Wahala
9. Canton of Akpakpapé
10. Canton of Hahomégbé

=== Kloto Prefecture ===
- Capital: Kpalimé; 14 Cantons
1. Canton of Kpalimé
2. Canton of Agomé–Tomégbé
3. Canton of Agomé–Yoh
4. Canton of Gbalavé
5. Canton of Hanyigba
6. Canton of Kpadapé
7. Canton of Kpimé
8. Canton of Kuma
9. Canton of Lanvié
10. Canton of Lavié–Apédomé
11. Canton of Tomé
12. Canton of Tové
13. Canton of Woamé
14. Canton of Yokélé

=== Kpélé Prefecture ===
- Capital: Kpélé–Adeta; 09 Cantons
1. Canton of Kpélé–Akata
2. Canton of Kpélé–Dawlotu
3. Canton of Kpélé–Dutoè
4. Canton of Kpélé–Gbalédzé
5. Canton of Kpélé–Goudévé
6. Canton of Kpélé–Govié
7. Canton of Kpélé–Kamè
8. Canton of Kpélé–Nord
9. Canton of Kpélé–Novivé

=== Moyen-Mono Prefecture ===
- Capital: Tohoun; 06 Cantons
1. Canton of Tohoun
2. Canton of Ahassomé
3. Canton of Katomé
4. Canton of Kpékplémé
5. Canton of Saligbè
6. Canton of Tado

=== Ogou Prefecture ===
- Capital: Atakpame; 08 Cantons
1. Canton of Gnagna
2. Canton of Akparé
3. Canton of Datcha
4. Canton of Djama
5. Canton of Gléï
6. Canton of Katoré
7. Canton of Ountivou
8. Canton of Woudou

=== Wawa Prefecture ===
- Capital: Badou; 12 Cantons
1. Canton of Badou
2. Canton of Doumé
3. Canton of Ekéto
4. Canton of Gbadi–N’Kugna
5. Canton of Gobé
6. Canton of Késsibo
7. Canton of Klabè–Efoukpa
8. Canton of Kpété–Bena
9. Canton of Okou
10. Canton of Ounabé
11. Canton of Tomégbé
12. Canton of Zogbégan

== Savanes Region ==
- 07 Prefectures; 69 Cantons

=== Cinkassé Prefecture ===
- Capital: Cinkassé; 08 Cantons
1. Canton of Cinkassé
2. Canton of Biankouri
3. Canton of Boadé
4. Canton of Gouloungoussi
5. Canton of Nadjoundi
6. Canton of Noaga
7. Canton of Samnaba
8. Canton of Timbou

=== Kpendjal Prefecture ===
- Capital: Mandouri; 4 Cantons
1. Canton of Mandouri
2. Canton of Borgou
3. Canton of Koundjoaré
4. Canton of Tambigou

=== Kpendjal-Ouest Prefecture ===
- Capital: Naki–Est; 7 Cantons
1. Canton of Naki–Est
2. Canton of Namondjoga
3. Canton of Nayéga
4. Canton of Ogaro
5. Canton of Papri
6. Canton of Pogno
7. Canton of Tambonga

=== Oti Prefecture ===
- Capital: Sansanne–Mango; 8 Cantons
1. Canton of Mango
2. Canton of Barkoissi
3. Canton of Faré
4. Canton of Galangashie
5. Canton of Loko
6. Canton of Nagbéni
7. Canton of Sadori
8. Canton of Tchanaga

=== Oti-Sud Prefecture ===
- Capital: Gando; 8 Cantons
1. Canton of Gando
2. Canton of Koumongou
3. Canton of Kountoiré
4. Canton of Mogou
5. Canton of Nali
6. Canton of Sagbièbou
7. Canton of Takpamba
8. Canton of Tchamonga

=== Tandjouaré Prefecture ===
- Capital: Tandjouare; 16 Cantons
1. Canton of Bogou
2. Canton of Bagou
3. Canton of Bombouaka
4. Canton of Boulogou
5. Canton of Doukpergou
6. Canton of Goundoga
7. Canton of Loko
8. Canton of Lokpanou
9. Canton of Mamproug
10. Canton of Nandoga
11. Canton of Nano
12. Canton of Pligou
13. Canton of Sangou
14. Canton of Sissiak
15. Canton of Tamongou
16. Canton of Tampialime

=== Tone Prefecture ===
- Capital: Dapaong; 18 Cantons
1. Canton of Dapaong
2. Canton of Bidjenga
3. Canton of Kantindi
4. Canton of Korbongou
5. Canton of Kourientré
6. Canton of Lotogou
7. Canton of Louanga
8. Canton of Naki–Ouest
9. Canton of Namaré
10. Canton of Nanergou
11. Canton of Natigou
12. Canton of Nioukpourma
13. Canton of Pana
14. Canton of Poissongui
15. Canton of Sanfatoute
16. Canton of Tami
17. Canton of Toaga
18. Canton of Warkambou
