= List of hospitals in Togo =

This list of hospitals in Togo contains the name, location, type, owner, and coordinates for hospitals in Togo. There were 207 medical facilities in Togo in 2019. The types of public medical facilities include Régional (3), Préfectoral (31), and Universitaire (3) hospitals, as well as 77 Centre Médico-social and Unité de Soins Périphérique medical facilities. There are several faith-based hospitals in Togo.

== Hospitals ==
The hospitals in Togo are listed below, including name, city, Region, type, ownership, coordinates, and references.

Hospitals in the Togo
Name	City	Region	Type facility	Ownership	Coordinates	Ref
Agou Centre Hospitalier Préfectoral	Agou Prefecture	Plateaux	Préfectoral	Public	6.85315°N 0.716066°E	
Amlame Centre Hospitalier Préfectoral	Amlamé	Plateaux	Préfectoral	Public	7.45615°N 0.903277°E	
Anié Centre Hospitalier Préfectoral	Anié	Plateaux	Préfectoral	Public	7.74726°N 1.200867°E	
Assahoun Centre Hospitalier Préfectoral	Kévé	Maritime	Préfectoral	Public	6.43029°N 0.930962°E	
Atakpamé Centre Hospitalier Préfectoral	Atakpamé	Plateaux	Préfectoral	Public	7.515455°N 1.14869°E	
Atakpamé Centre Hospitalier Régional	Atakpamé	Plateaux	Préfectoral	Public	7.51363°N 1.14777628697°E	
Badou Centre Hospitalier Préfectoral	Badou	Plateaux	Préfectoral	Public	7.5866°N 0.608575°E	
Bafilo Centre Hospitalier Préfectoral	Bafilo	Kara Region	Préfectoral	Public	9.35105°N 1.244738°E	
Bassar Centre Hospitalier Préfectoral	Bassar	Kara Region	Préfectoral	Public	9.26204°N 0.779027°E	
Blitta Centre Hospitalier Préfectoral	Blitta	Centrale	Préfectoral	Public	8.3233°N 0.981426°E	
Campus University Centre Hospitalier Universitaire	Lomé	Lomé	Universitaire	Public	6.17976°N 1.2120439°E	
Cinkasee Centre Hospitalier Préfectoral	Cinkassé Prefecture	Savanes	Préfectoral	Public	11.1039°N 0.0094°E	
Dankpen Centre Hospitalier Préfectoral	Dankpen Prefecture	Kara Region	Préfectoral	Public	9.68853°N 0.610828°E	
Dapaong Centre Hospitalier Régional	Dapaong	Savanes	Régional	Public	10.8689°N 0.204969°E	
Doufelgou Centre Hospitalier Préfectoral	Niamtougou	Kara Region	Préfectoral	Public	9.76806°N 1.105278°E	
Elavagnon Centre Hospitalier Préfectoral	Elavagnon	Plateaux	Préfectoral	Public	8°N 1.3°E	
Hôpital Baptiste Biblique (Karolyn Kempton Memorial Christian Hospital)	Adeta	Plateaux	Private	Faith-Based	7.1263059140337175°N 0.7005365387176496°E	
Hospital of Hope ABWE	Mango	Savanes	Private	Faith-based	10.376819033401977°N 0.47554802762044734°E	
Kandé Centre Hospitalier Préfectoral	Kandé	Kara Region	Préfectoral	Public	9.95586°N 1.043619°E	
Kara-University Centre Hospitalier Universitaire	Kara	Kara Region	Universitaire	Public	9.54877°N 1.198086°E	
Kougnohou Centre Hospitalier Préfectoral	Kougnohou	Plateaux	Préfectoral	Public	7.65401°N 0.789316°E	
Kpalimé Centre Hospitalier Préfectoral	Kpalimé	Plateaux	Préfectoral	Public	6.91064°N 0.632057°E	
Lacs Centre Hospitalier Préfectoral	Aného	Maritime	Préfectoral	Public	6.22728°N 1.581424°E	
Lomé Commune Centre Hospitalier Régional	Lomé	Lomé	Régional	Public	6.17902°N 1.23257022001°E	
Mandouri Centre Hospitalier Préfectoral	Mandouri	Savanes	Préfectoral	Public	10.8475°N 0.800442°E	
Mango Centre Hospitalier Préfectoral	Mango	Savanes	Préfectoral	Public	10.3576°N 0.4773°E	
Notse Centre Hospitalier Préfectoral	Notsé	Plateaux	Préfectoral	Public	6.94802°N 1.170302°E	
Pogouda Centre Hospitalier Préfectoral	Kpagouda	Kara Region	Préfectoral	Public	9.75286°N 1.32922°E	
Polyclinic St. Joseph	Lomé	Lomé	Faith-based	Private	6.177416964555225°N 1.2408880736182353°E	
Sokode Centre Hospitalier Préfectoral	Sokodé	Centrale	Préfectoral	Public	8.988295°N 1.146714°E	
Sokodé Centre Hospitalier Régional	Sokodé	Centrale	Régional	Public	8.98459°N 1.13492°E	
Sotouboua Centre Hospitalier Préfectoral	Sotouboua	Centrale	Préfectoral	Public	8.56188°N 0.978764°E	
Tabligbo Centre Hospitalier Préfectoral	Tabligbo	Maritime	Préfectoral	Public	6.58333°N 1.5°E	
Tandjouaré Centre Hospitalier Préfectoral	Tandjouaré Prefecture	Savanes	Préfectoral	Public	10.6559°N 0.195°E	
Tchamba Centre Hospitalier Préfectoral	Tchamba	Centrale	Préfectoral	Public	9.02668°N 1.416516°E	
Tohoun Centre Hospitalier Préfectoral	Tohoun	Plateaux	Préfectoral	Public	7.02262°N 1.615901°E	
Tokoin University Centre Hospitalier Universitaire	Lomé	Lomé	Universitaire	Public	6.14524°N 1.205958°E	
Tomdè Centre Hospitalier Régional	Kara	Kara Region	Régional	Public	9.55323°N 1.202887°E	
Tone Centre Hospitalier Préfectoral	Dapaong	Savanes	Préfectoral	Public	10.868901°N 0.204969°E	
Tsevie Centre Hospitalier Préfectoral	Tsévié	Maritime	Préfectoral	Public	6.423215°N 1.210459°E	
Vogan Centre Hospitalier Préfectoral	Vogan	Maritime	Préfectoral	Public	6.33496°N 1.529707°E	
