= Tingban-Paab =

Harvest festival in northern Togo

- Celebration of Tingban-Paab
- Observed by: Moba, Gurma, Mossi, Fula
- Type: Harvest festival
- Significance: Thanksgiving to the ancestors for the harvest
- Date: Second Saturday of December
- Frequency: Annual

Tingban-Paab is an annual traditional harvest festival held in the Grand Tône area of the Savanes Region in northern Togo.

Celebrated on the second Saturday of December by the Moba, Gurma, Mossi, Fula and related peoples, it gives thanks to the ancestors and guardian spirits for the harvest. Interrupted after 2019, it was revived in December 2025.

== Name and date ==
The name means "offering to the ancestors" (Tingban: altar; Paab: offering). The festival marks the end of the harvest and honours the ancestors and guardian spirits (Tingbana). It takes place on the second Saturday of December in the prefectures of Tône, Tandjouaré, Cinkassé, Kpendjal and Kpendjal-Ouest, among the Moba, Gurma, Mossi, Fula and related peoples.

== Celebration ==
According to traditional belief, God (Yendu) cannot be approached directly, so people thank the ancestors and guardian spirits for their protection and for a good harvest. The festival includes traditional offerings, dancing and music, processions with farm produce and the sharing of local dishes, as well as sports competitions and services in churches and mosques. It strengthens social ties, passes the culture on to young people and supports the local economy and tourism.

== History ==
The festival was held every year from the mid-2000s; the 2019 edition was the fourteenth in a row. After 2019 it was suspended because of the COVID-19 pandemic and insecurity in the north of the country. It was held again on 13 December 2025 in Tône, attended by senior national officials and traditional delegations from Ghana and Burkina Faso.

== See also ==
- Culture of Togo
