= Agbandi =

Abgandi
- Location in Togo
- Coordinates: 8°13′25.36″N 1°8′9.61″E
- Country: Togo
- Region: Centrale
- Prefecture: Blitta

Agbandi is a canton located in the Blitta Prefecture, in the Centrale Region of Togo.
