= Madjoulba Batocfetou =

Togolese agronomic engineer (died 2026)

- Died: 7 January 2026; Lomé, Togo
- Occupation: Agronomic engineer

Madjoulba Batocfetou (died 7 January 2026) was a Togolese agronomic engineer who served as interim director-general of the Institut de conseil et d'appui technique.

== Life and career ==
Batocfetou began his career with the Institut de recherche café-cacao and the Centre de recherche agronomique zone forestière in Kpalimé. He then began as head of the Institut de conseil et d'appui technique in Moyen-Mono, Kpendjal, and Wawa. In August 2023, he was promoted to be the institute's interim director-general. Under his leadership, the institute became involved in several national and regional initiatives, including: the RICOWAS project, aimed at strengthening rice cultivation in ECOWAS countries and forged a partnership with China. He also developed the Système d'information sur les sols du Togo along with international partners.

Batocfetou died in Lomé on 7 January 2026.
