= Diguengué =

- Location in Togo
- Coordinates: 8°4′54.55″N 0°38′28.79″E
- Country: Togo
- Region: Centrale
- Prefecture: Blitta

Diguengué is a canton located in the Blitta Prefecture, in the Centrale Region of Togo.
