= Atchintsé =

- Location in Togo
- Coordinates: 8°0′14.1″N 0°39′31.88″E
- Country: Togo
- Region: Centrale
- Prefecture: Blitta

Atchintsé is a canton located in the Blitta Prefecture, in the Centrale Region of Togo.
