= Dikpéléou =

- Location in Togo
- Coordinates: 8°11′33.61″N 0°37′5.48″E
- Country: Togo
- Region: Centrale
- Prefecture: Blitta

Dikpéléou is a canton located in the Blitta Prefecture, in the Centrale Region of Togo.
