= Nok and Mamproug Cave Dwellings =

Caves in Savanes region of Togo

Located in the Tandjouaré Prefecture in the Savanes Region of northern Togo, Africa, the caves of Nôk and Mamproug contain shelter and refuge structures built between the 17th and 19th centuries mainly for defensive purposes.

== Site description ==
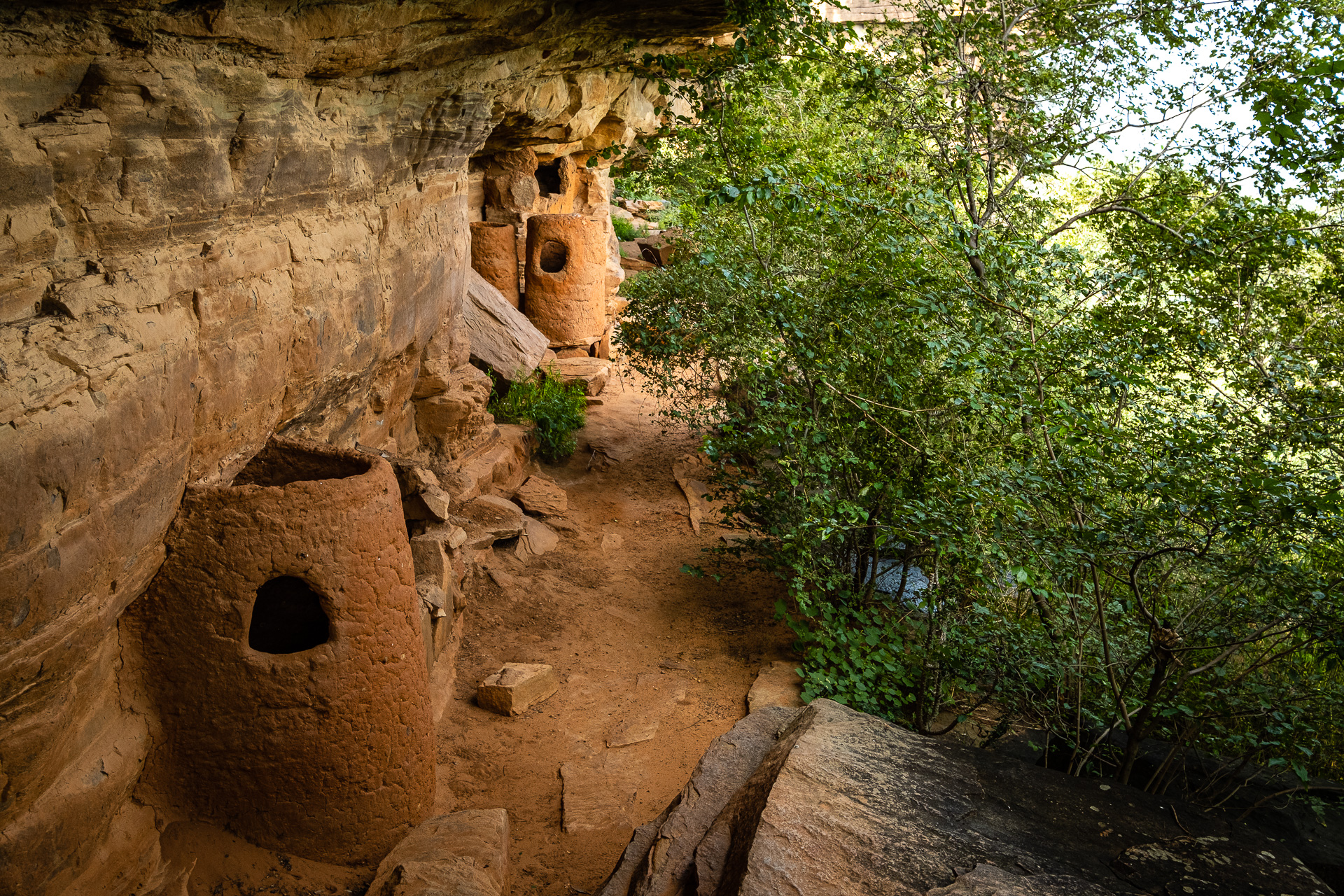
Granaries in the caves of Nôk in northern Togo.

In total, the caves contain over 300 structures: roughly 134 structures in Nôk, 113 in Mamproug and 70 in Bopak. The structures, mostly cylindrical and oblong in shape, open upwards and can stand two and a half meters high. Mostly made from local materials such as clay, straw, and stones, the structures allow their builders to protect their precious crop harvest from being plundered. The Konkomba, Moba, and Mamprussi are among the peoples are believed to be the builders of the cave structures.

== World Heritage status ==
This site was added to the UNESCO World Heritage Tentative List on December 12, 2000 in the Cultural category. The UNESCO submission was updated in December 2021 to include the granaries at Kouba and Bagou.

== Archaeology ==
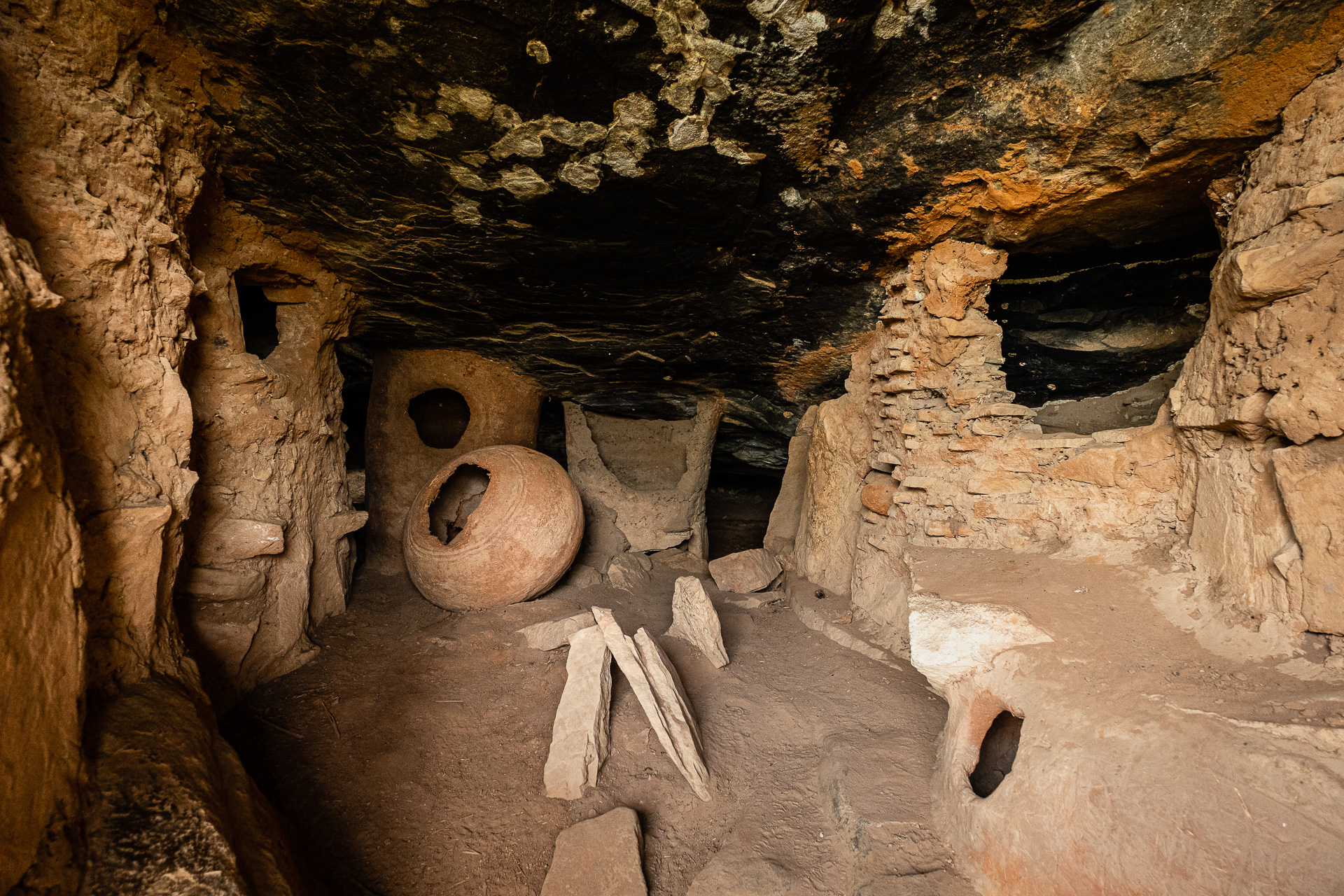
Granaries, pottery and a cooking area in the caves of Nôk in northern Togo.

Still intact upon discovery, the caves contained pottery and many specimens of bows, arrows, and quivers.
