= Akébou Prefecture =

Prefecture in the Plateaux Region of Togo

Coordinates: 7°39′21.42″N 0°47′32.21″E

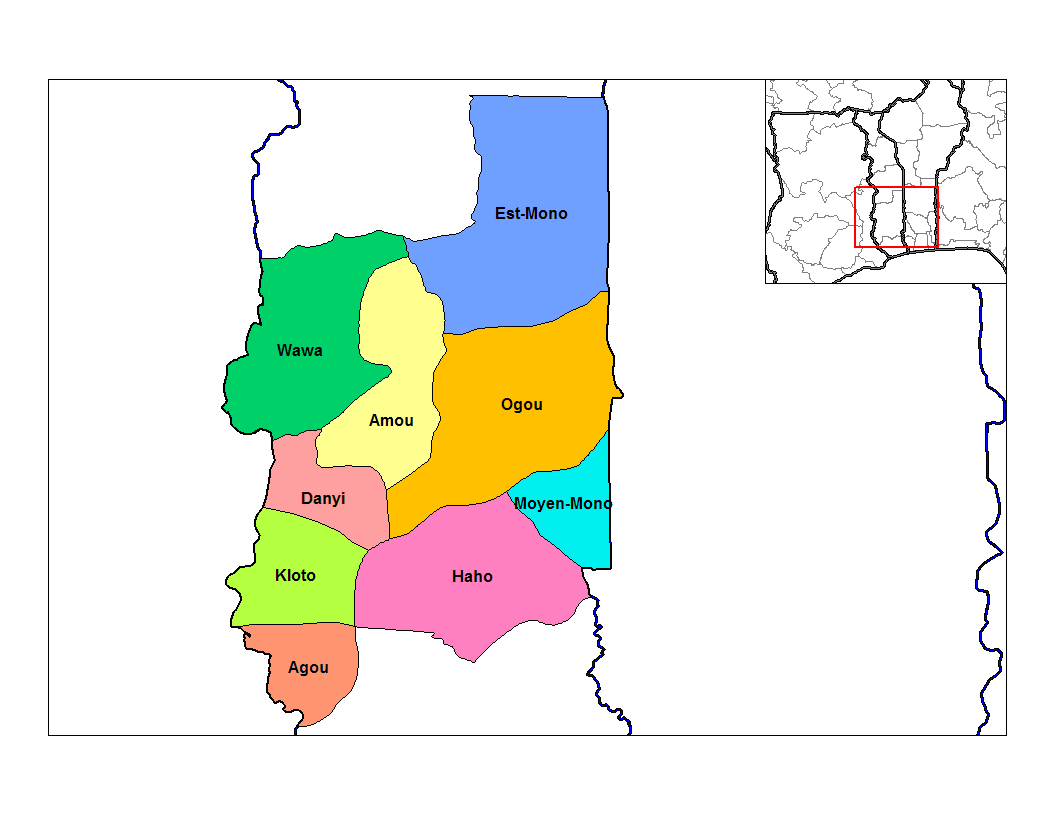
Prefectures of Plateaux

Akébou is a prefecture located in the Plateaux Region of Togo. The prefecture covers 1,130 km^{2}, with a population in 2022 of 73,830.

Cantons of Akébou include Kougnohou (Akébou), Djon, Gbendé, Sérégbéné, Yalla, Kamina-Akébou, Vèh, and Kpalavé.
