= Tchamba Prefecture =

Coordinates: 9°02′N 1°25′E

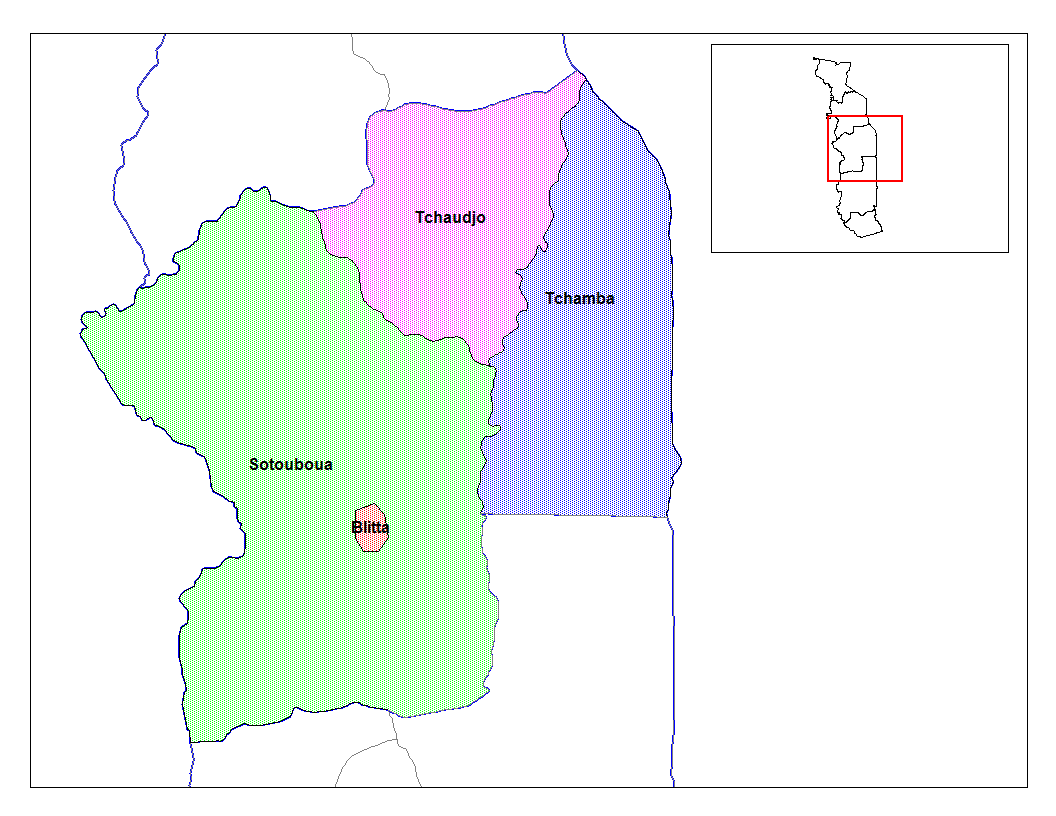

Tchamba Prefecture is one of the prefectures of Togo located in the Centrale Region. At the time of the 2022 census it had a population of 200,585 people.

The center is at Tchamba. The cantons (or subdivisions) of Tchamba include Tchamba, Koussountou, Adjéidè (Kri-Kri), Kaboli, Balanka, Alibi, Affem, Larini, Bago, and Goubi.

== See also ==
- Tchamba
