= Anié Prefecture =

Prefecture in the Maritime Region of Togo

Coordinates: 7°45′27″N 1°10′33″E

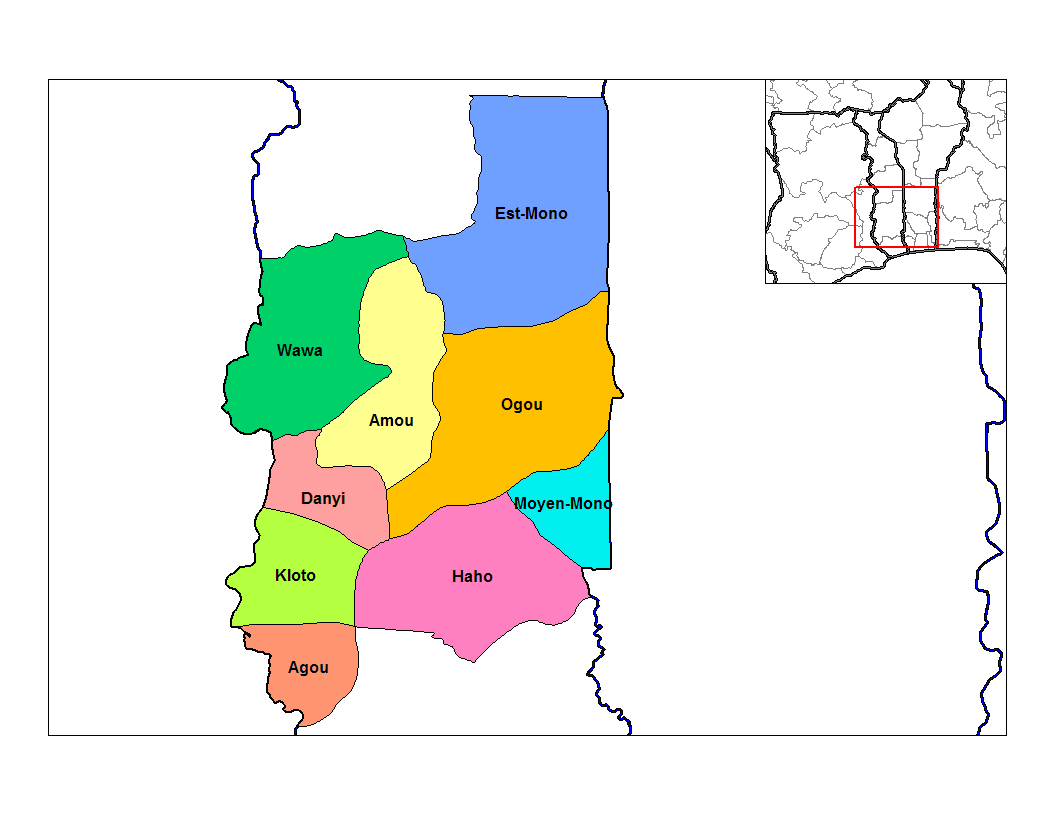
Prefectures of Plateaux

Anié is a prefecture located in the Plateaux Region of Togo. The prefecture covers 1,967 km^{2}, with a population in 2022 of 180,158.

Cantons of Anié include Anié, Pallakoko, Kolo-Kopé, Adogbénou, Glitto, and Atchinèdji.
