= Biankouri =

Town in Togo

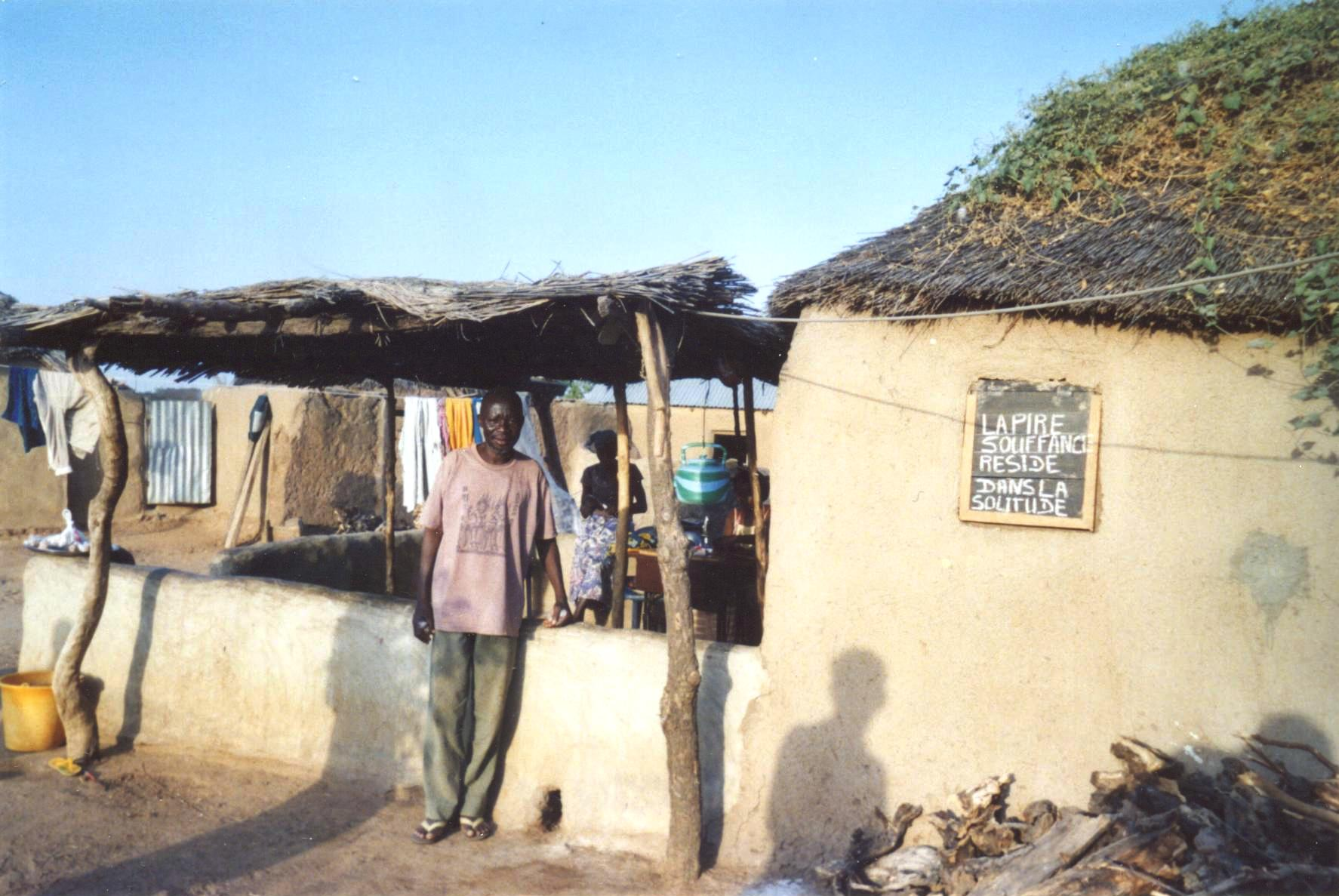

- Location in Togo
- Coordinates: 11°1′10″N 0°3′17″E
- Country: Togo
- Region: Savanes Region
- Elevation: 896 ft (273 m)
- Time zone: UTC + 0

Biankouri is a small town in the Savanes Region of north-western Togo. In 2010 it was estimated to have 15,560 inhabitants, mostly of the Moba ethnic group.

The land around the town is flat and there are no other nearby towns. Most of the area is agricultural. The Biankouri River is near town.

The nearest airport is Djangou Airport in Dapaong.

The climate is a tropical savanna.
