= Kpélé Prefecture =

Refecture in the Plateaux Region of Togo

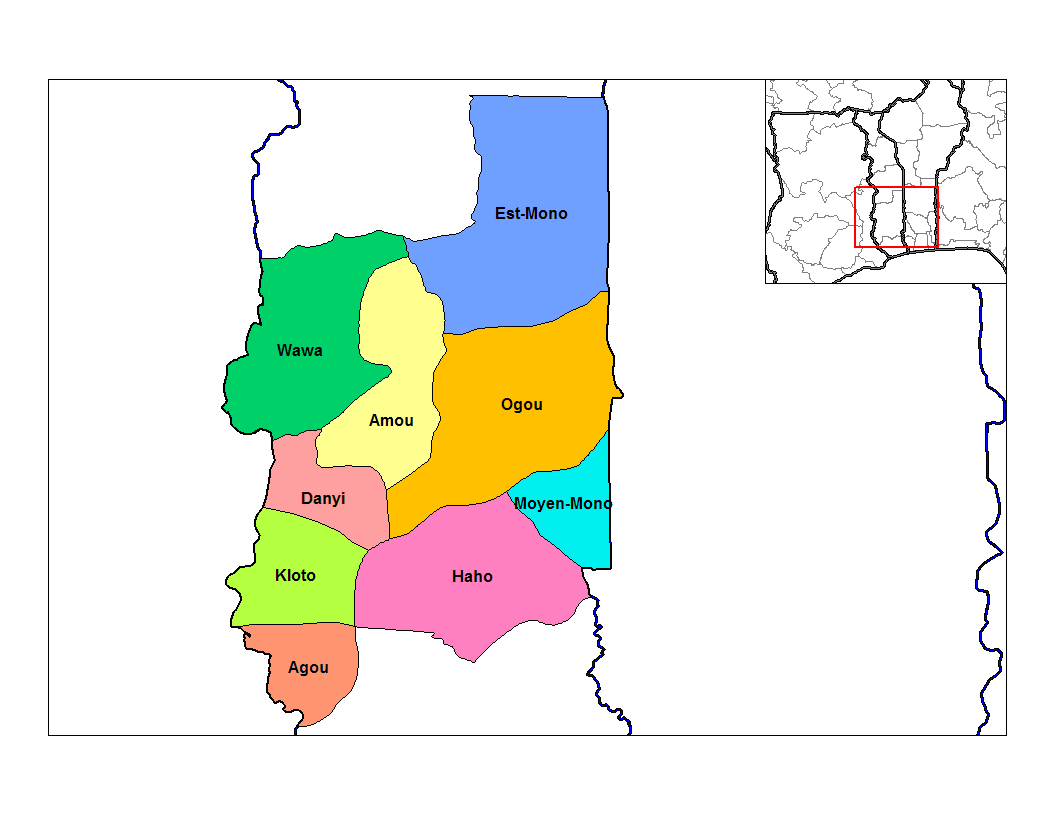
Prefectures of Plateaux

Kpélé is a prefecture located in the Plateaux Region of Togo. The prefecture covers 930 km^{2}, with a population in 2022 of 80,939.

Cantons of Kpélé include Kpélé-Akata, Kpélé-Goudévé, Kpélé-Kamè, Kpélé-Nord, Kpélé-Novivé, Kpélé-Govié, Kpélé-Dawlotu, Kpélé-Gbalédzé, and Kpélé-Dutoè.
