= Agou =

Agou may refer to:

== People ==
- Christophe Agou (born 1969), French photographer

== Places ==
- Agou, Ivory Coast
- Agou, Togo
- Mount Agou, a mountain in Togo
