= List of Togolese regions by Human Development Index =

This is a list of Togolese regions by Human Development Index as of 2022, and the city of Lomé.

Rank	Province	HDI (2022)
Medium human development
1	Lomé	0.617
Low human development
–	Togo	0.547
2	Centrale	0.534
2	Plateaux	0.534
4	Maritime	0.527
5	Kara	0.515
6	Savanes	0.471
