= Ogou Prefecture =

Coordinates: 7.5167°N 1.1167°E

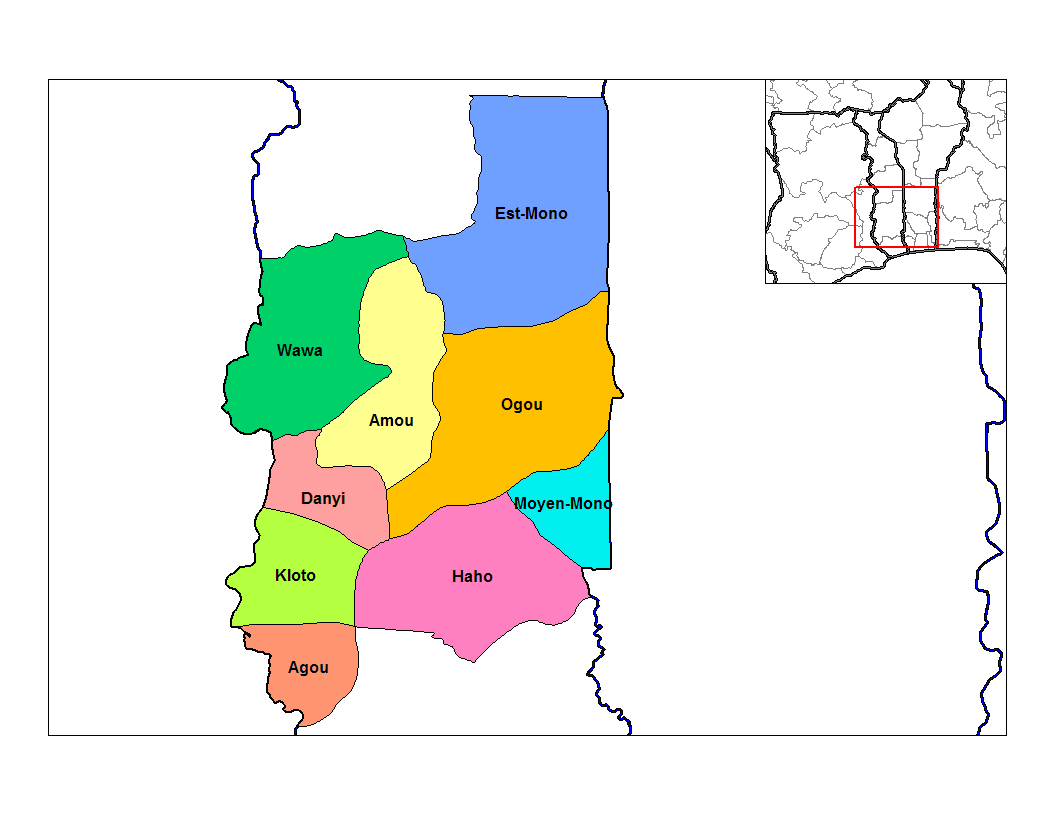
Prefectures of Plateaux

Ogou is a prefecture located in the Plateaux Region of Togo. The prefecture covers 1,928 km^{2}, with a population in 2022 of 253,467. The prefecture seat is located in Atakpamé.

Cantons of Ogou include Gnagna, Djama, Woudou, Katoré, Gléï, Ountivou, Akparé, and Datcha.
