= Adeta =

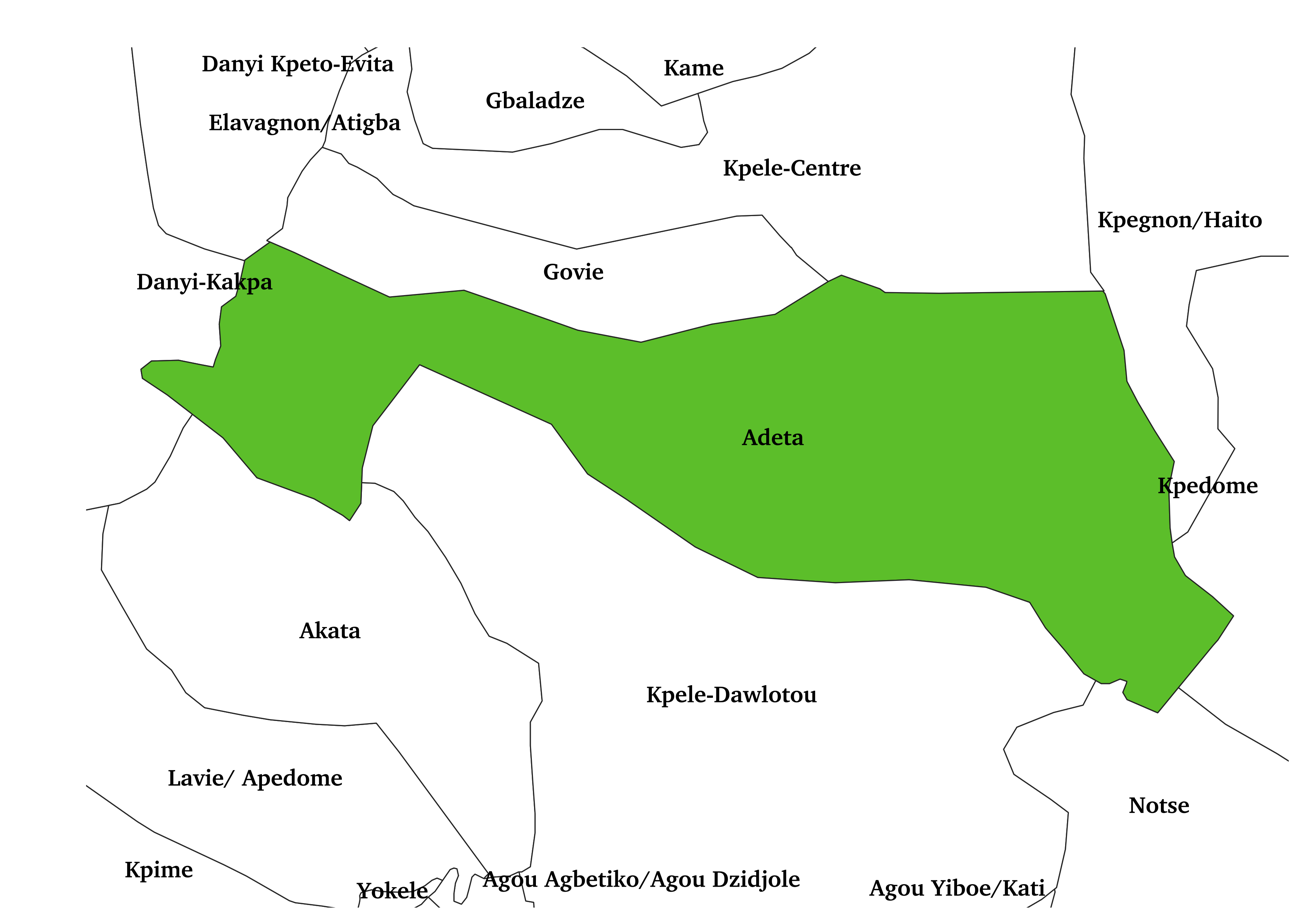
- Map of the Adeta canton located in Togo in the Plateaux region

- Location in Togo
- Coordinates: 7°7′N 0°43′E
- Country: Togo
- Region: Plateaux Region

Adeta is a town in the Plateaux Region of Togo. Adeta is also a tourist town. Adeta is Ewe ethnic group in plateau region. Most of the population are farmers.
