= Est-Mono Prefecture =

Coordinates: 7°26′51″N 0°50′50″E

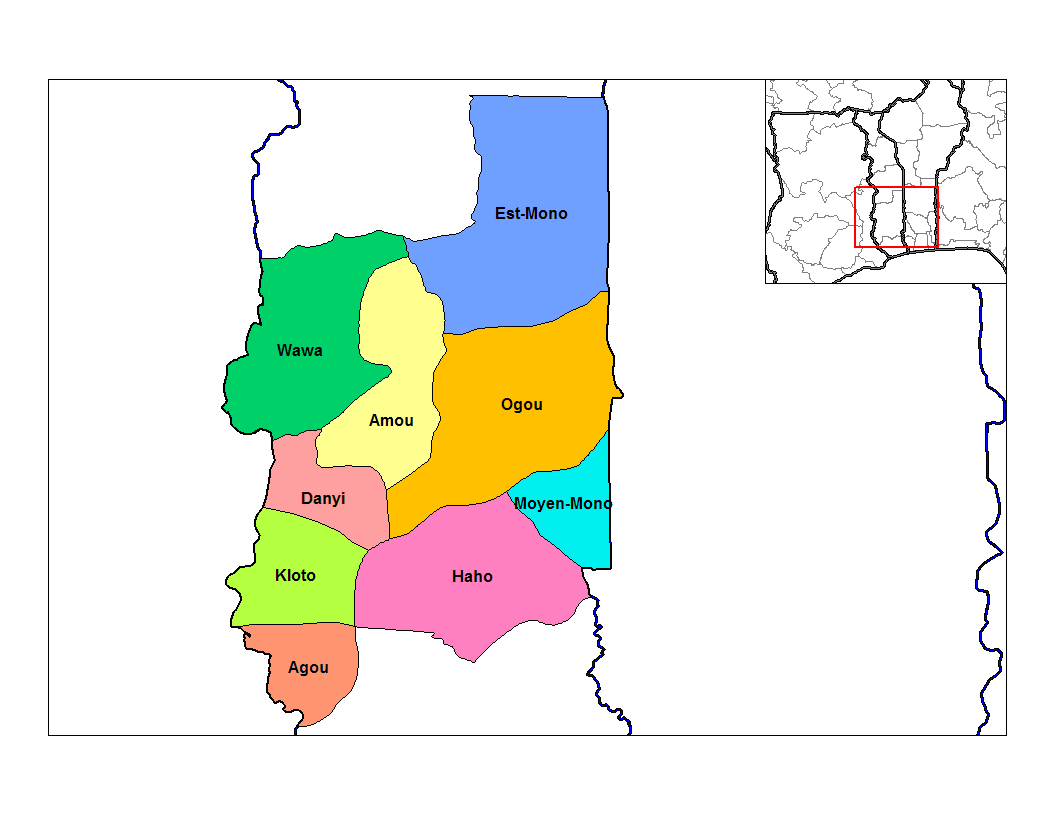
Prefectures of Plateaux

Est-Mono is a prefecture located in the Plateaux Region of Togo. The prefecture covers 2,599 km^{2}, with a population in 2022 of 164,460. The prefecture seat is located in Elavagnon.

Cantons of Est-Mono include Elavagnon, Nyamassila, Kamina, Morétan-Igbérioko, Kpéssi, Gbadjahè, and Badin-Copé.
