= Mandouri =

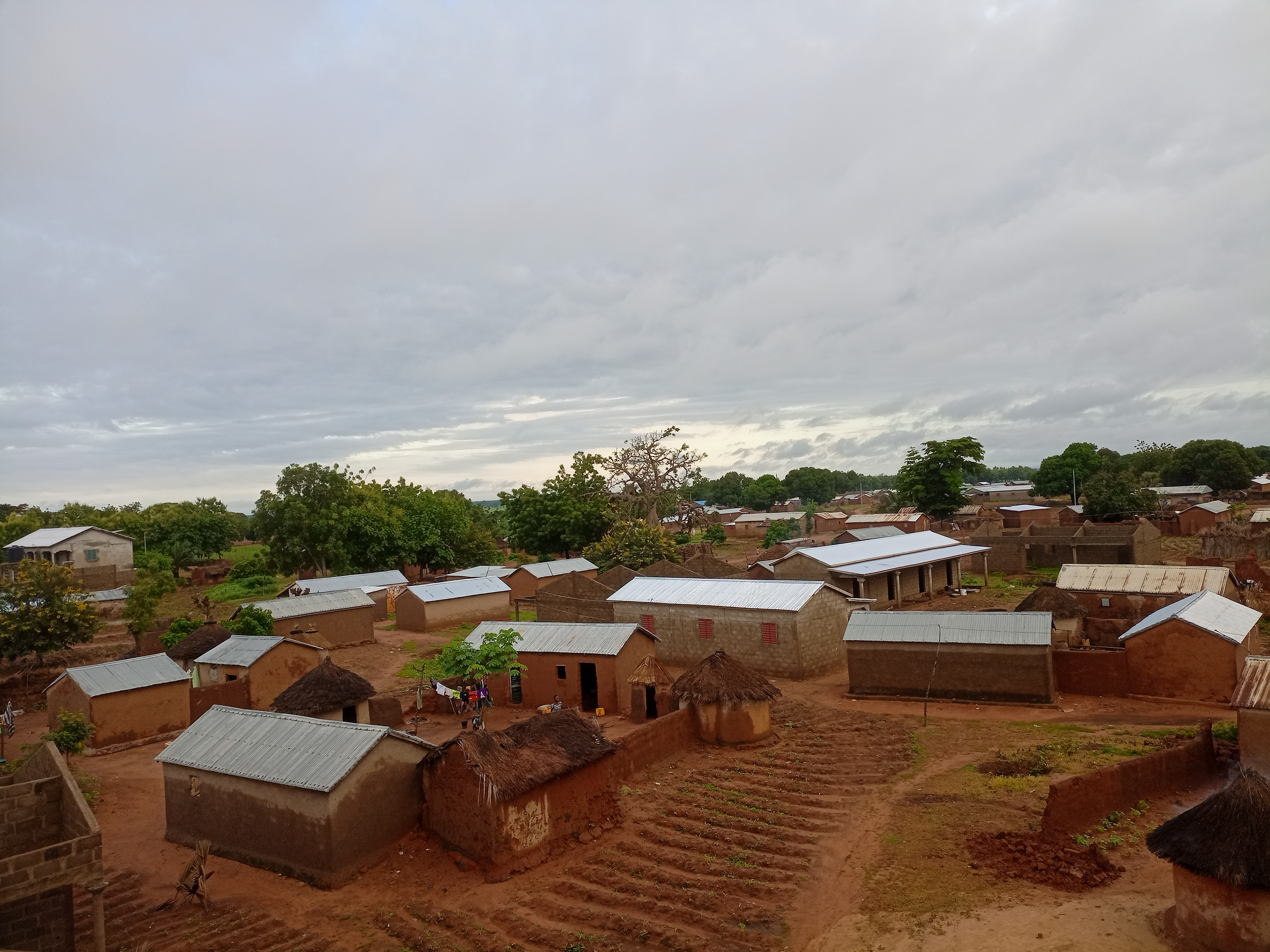
- Residential houses in the city

- Location in Togo
- Coordinates: 10°51′34.6″N 0°49′14.9″E
- Country: Togo
- Region: Savanes Region
- Prefecture: Kpendjal
- Elevation: 1,180 ft (360 m)

Mandouri is a city in Togo. It is the seat of Kpendjal Prefecture in Savanes Region, located 48 km from the border with Ghana, 105 km from the city of Dapaong and about 600 km from the capital, Lomé. The population of the city is about 7,700 in 2022.

== Climate ==
Climate data for Mandouri (1991-2020)
Month	Jan	Feb	Mar	Apr	May	Jun	Jul	Aug	Sep	Oct	Nov	Dec	Year
Average precipitation mm (inches)	2.6 (0.10)	9.9 (0.39)	32.4 (1.28)	74.8 (2.94)	133.7 (5.26)	181.1 (7.13)	251.8 (9.91)	263.4 (10.37)	252.0 (9.92)	119.2 (4.69)	13.3 (0.52)	0.4 (0.02)	1,334.6 (52.54)
Average precipitation days (≥ 1 mm)	0.2	0.8	2.6	7.0	10.8	12.2	17.4	18.0	18.5	10.7	1.6	0.1	99.9
Source: NOAA
