= Djangou Airport =

Airport in Togo

- IATA: none; ICAO: DXDP

Summary
- Serves: Dapaong, Togo
- Elevation AMSL: 919 ft (280 m)
- Coordinates: 10°48′05″N 00°14′32″E

Map
- Location within Togo

Runways
Direction	Length		Surface
Direction	m	ft	Surface
01/19	1,200	3,937	Unpaved
- Source: GCM Google Maps

Djangou Airport (ICAO: DXDP) is an airport serving Dapaong (also known as Dapaongo or Dapango), a city in the Savanes Region in Togo.

== Facilities ==
The airport resides at an elevation of 919 feet (280 m) above mean sea level. It has one runway which is 1,200 metres (3,937 ft) in length.
