= Wawa Prefecture =

Coordinates: 7°35′N 0°36′E

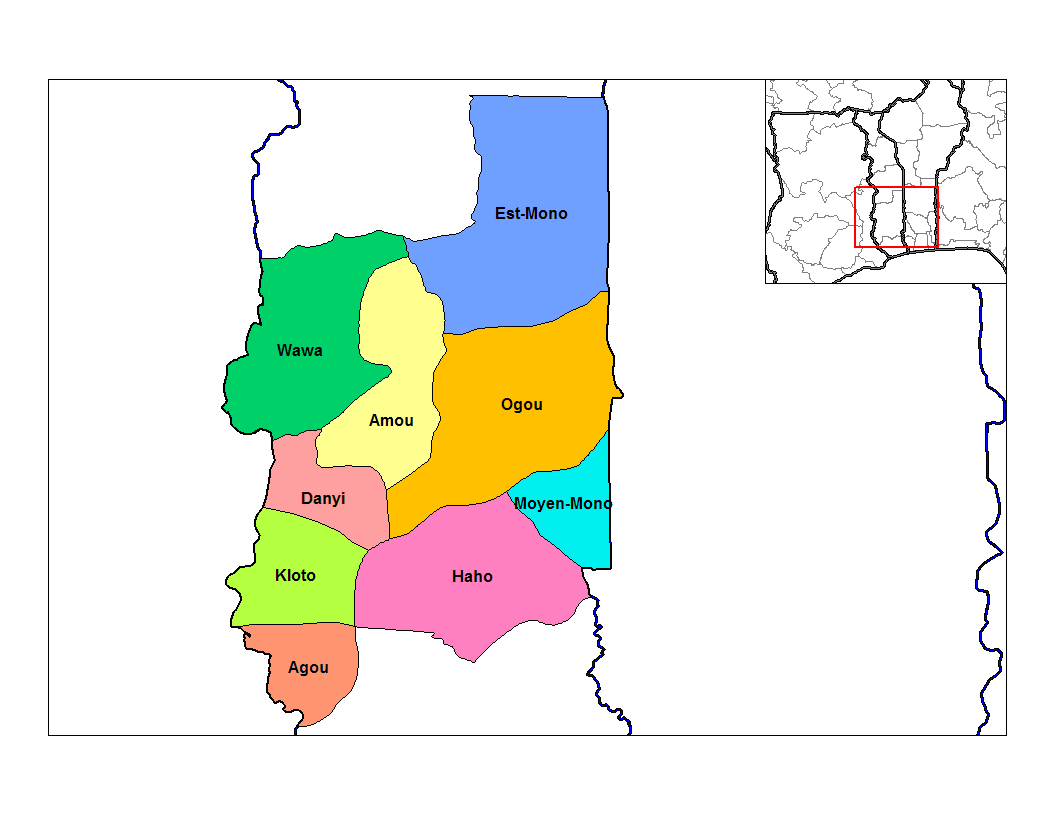
Prefectures of Plateaux

Wawa is a prefecture located in the Plateaux Region of Togo. The prefecture covers 1,209 km^{2}, with a population in 2022 of 101,300. The prefecture seat is located in Badou.

Cantons of Wawa include Badou, Tomégbé, Kpété-Bena, Gobé, Klabè-Efoukpa, Okou, Ekéto, Ounabé, Késsibo, Gbadi-N’Kugna, and Doumé.
