= Oti Prefecture =

Coordinates: 10°21′26″N 0°28′16″E

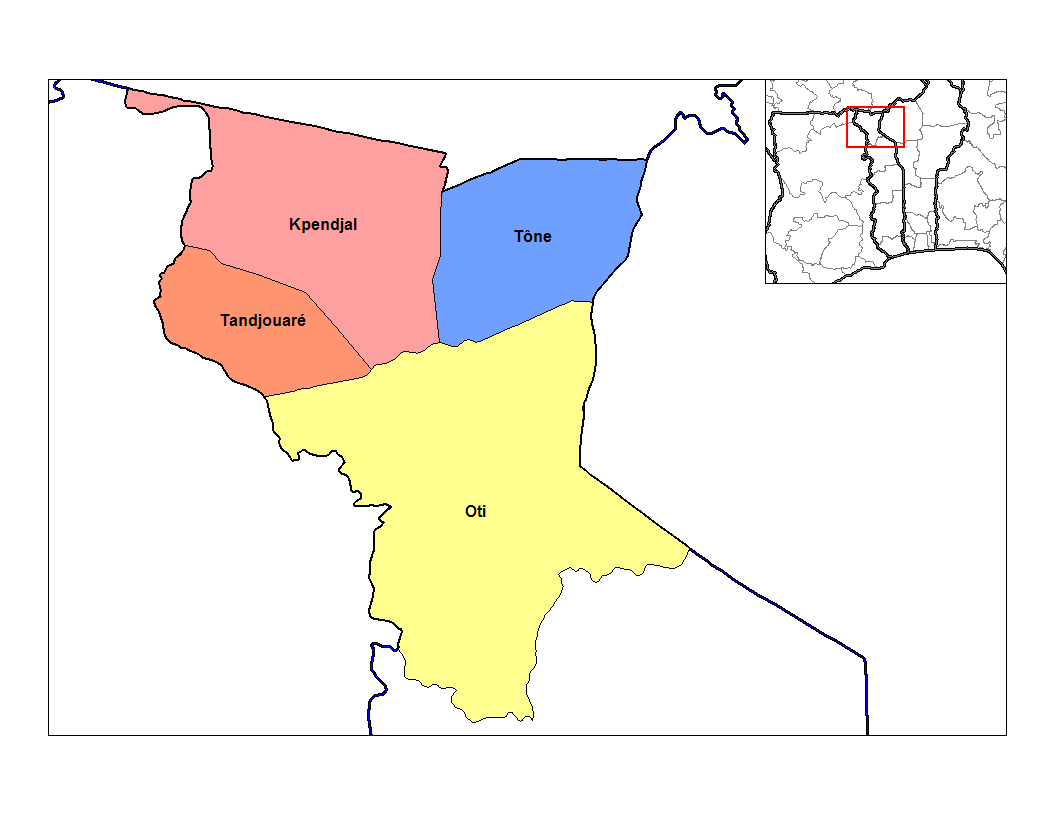
Prefectures of Savanes

Oti is a prefecture located in the Savanes Region of Togo. The prefecture seat is located in Sansanné-Mango. The prefecture covers 1,524 km^{2} (588 sq mi), with a population in 2022 of 124,848.

The cantons (or subdivisions) of Oti include Mango, Gando, Mogou, Koumongou, Nagbéni, Tchanaga, Takpamba, Galangashie, Barkoissi, Kountoiré, Nali, Faré, Loko, Sagbièbou, Tchamonga, Sadori.
