= Haho Prefecture =

Togo geography

Coordinates: 6°57′N 1°10′E

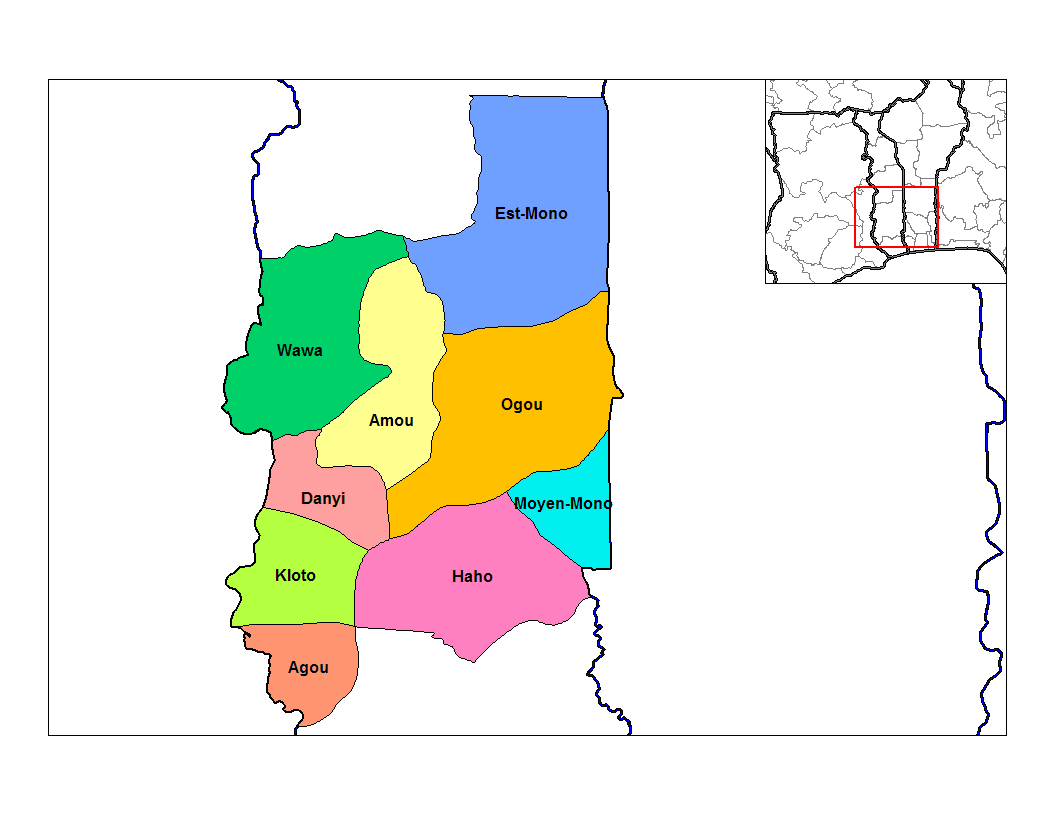
Prefectures of Plateaux

Haho is a prefecture located in the Plateaux Region of Togo. The prefecture covers 3,051 km^{2}, with a population in 2022 of 305,096. The prefecture seat is located in Notsé.

Cantons of Haho include Notsé, Wahala, Ayito, Assrama, Kpédomé, Dalia, Atsavé, and Djéméni. On October 12, 2018, two new cantons were created in Haho: Akpakpapé (commune 3) and Hahomégbé (commune 1).

The area is the ancestral land of the Aja people and Ewe people. Cotton and peanuts are major commercial crops.
