= Danyi Prefecture =

Coordinates: 7°15′N 0°57′E

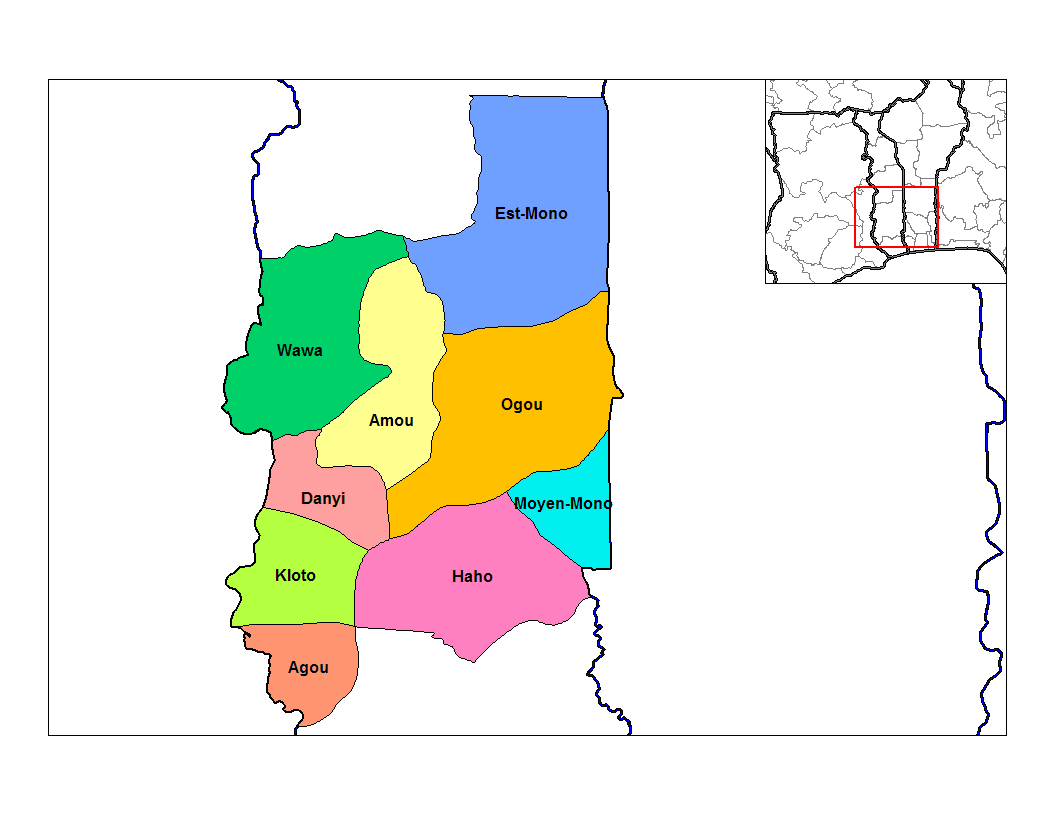
Prefectures of Plateaux

Danyi is a prefecture located in the Plateaux Region of Togo. The prefecture covers 396 km^{2}, with a population in 2022 of 40,240. The prefecture seat is located in Danyi-Apéyémé.

Danyi Prefecture consists of two communes, with Danyi 1, Danyi 2 covering areas that include Cantons such Danyi-Atigba, Ahlon, Danyi-Kakpa, Yikpa, Danyi-Kpéto, Evita, and Danyi-Elavagnon.

Danyi along with Agou were split of from the district of Kloto. Kpalime serves as the major urban center for the area.
