= Ahepe =

Village in southeast Togo

Coordinates: 06°36′N 01°23′E

Ahepe ("Ahépé" in French) is a village (now canton) in the southeast of Togo. Ahepe literally means "the house of Ahe". Founded around 1732, it is located approximately 63 km from Lomé, the political capital of Togo. Ahepe is a part of the district of Yoto, at 12 km from Tabligbo the capital of this district. It is3 km near Zafi in the west, 6 km from Kouve to the north, and 9 km from Tchekpo in the southern. Tabligbo lies in the east.
