= Tône Prefecture =

Prefecture of Togo

Coordinates: 10.8678°N 0.2036°E

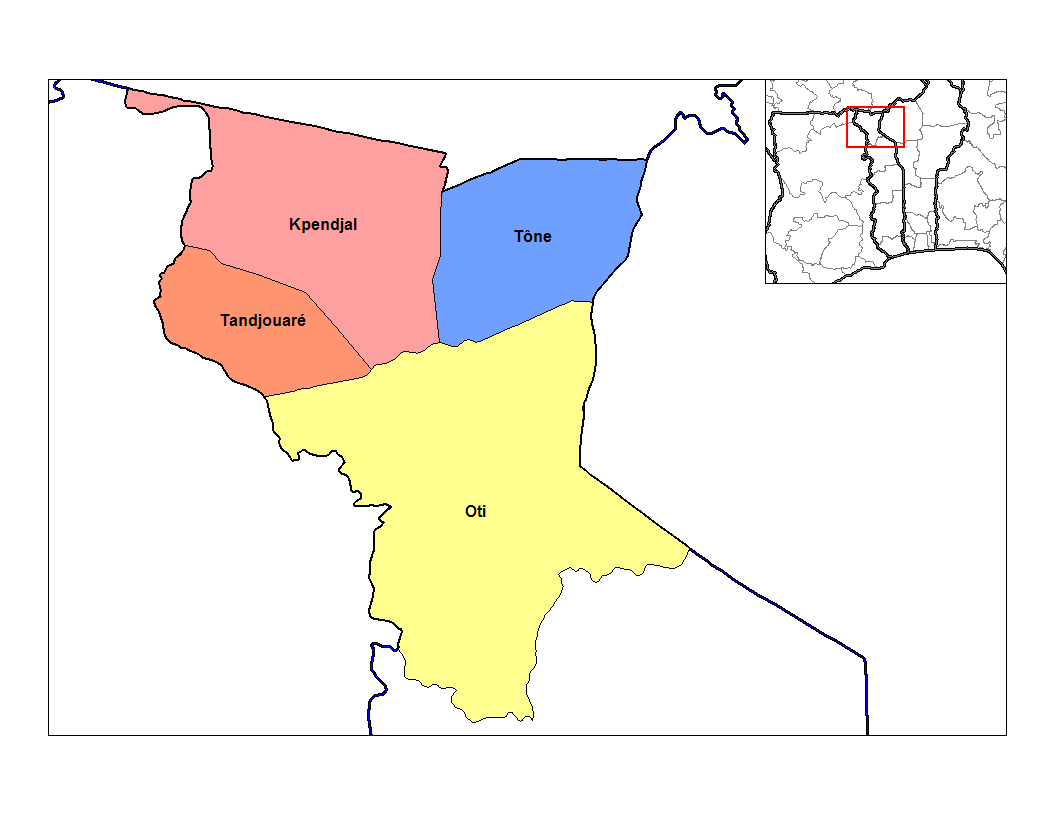
Prefectures of Savanes. Tône is in blue.

Tône is a prefecture located in the Savanes Region of Togo. The prefecture covers 1,210 km^{2}, with a population in 2022 of 388,775. The prefecture seat is located in Dapaong. The cantons (or subdivisions) of Tône include Dapaong; − Kantindi, Bidjenga, Tami, Lotogou, Warkambou, Nanergou, Nioukpourma, Pana, Naki-Ouest, Korbongou, Kourientré, Namaré, Louanga, Toaga, Poissongui, Sanfatoute, Natigou.
