= Tchaoudjo Prefecture =

Prefecture in Centrale Region, Togo

Coordinates: 8.9833°N 1.1333°E

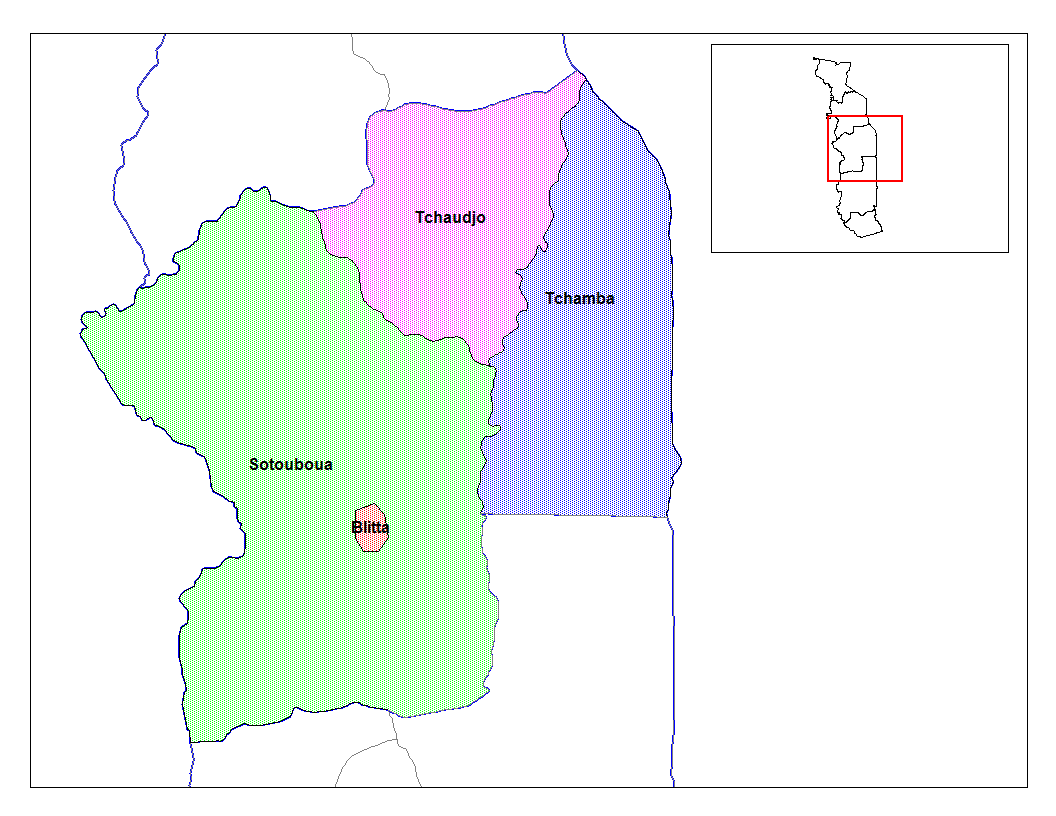
Prefectures of Centrale

Tchaoudjo is a prefecture located in the Centrale Region of Togo. The capital city is Sokodé. At the time of the 2022 census it had a population of 240,360 people.

Canton (administrative divisions) of Tchaoudjo include Komah, Kéméni, Agoulou, Wassarabo, Kparatao, Aléhéridè, Kadambara, Lama-Tessi, Kolina, Kpangalam, Tchalo, Kpassouadè, and Amaïdè.

== See also ==
- Alédjo Wildlife Reserve
