= Amou Prefecture =

Coordinates: 7.567°N 1.100°W

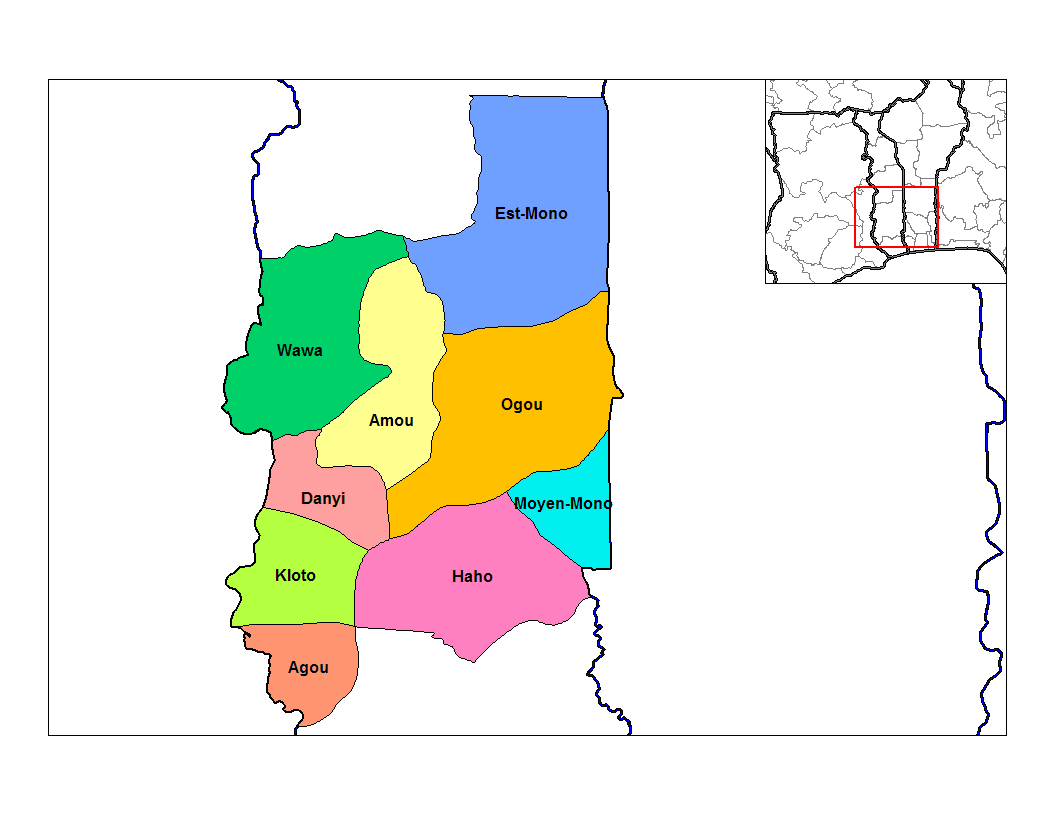
Prefectures of Plateaux

Amou Prefecture is a prefecture located in the Plateaux Region of Togo. The prefecture covers 1,808 km^{2}, with a population in 2022 of 114,172. The prefecture seat is located in Amlamé.
