= Moyen-Mono Prefecture =

Coordinates: 7°01′23″N 1°36′54″E

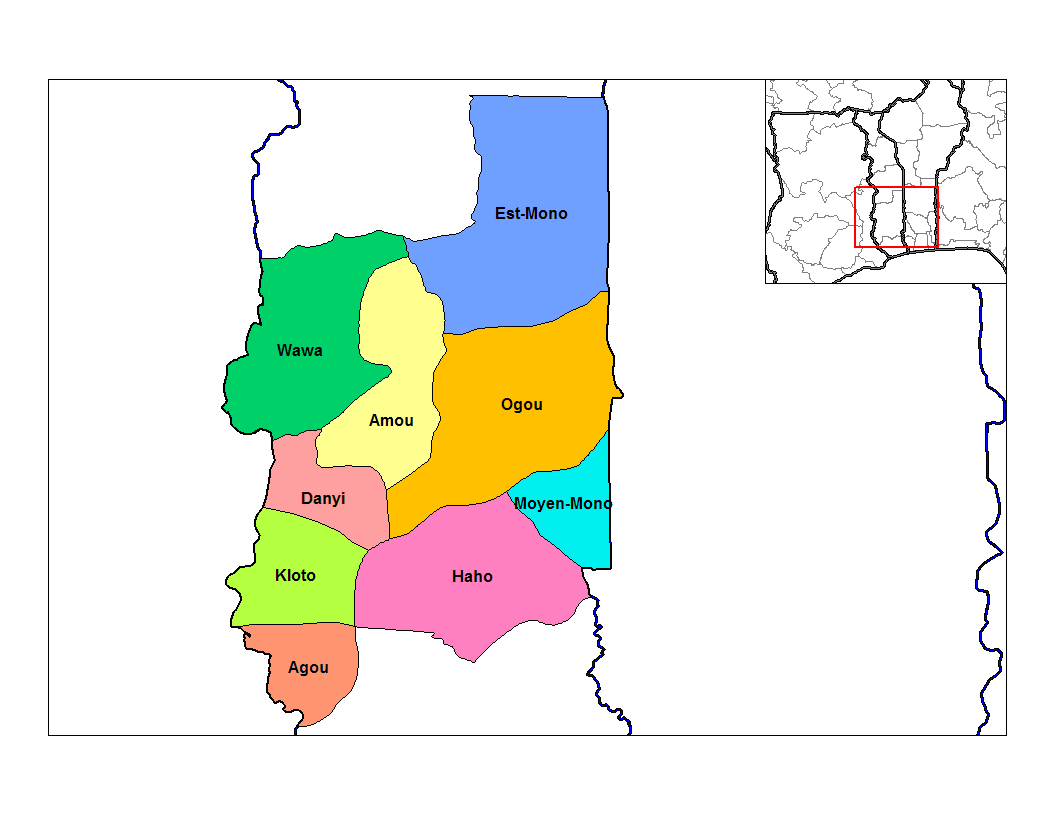
Prefectures of Plateaux

Moyen-Mono is a prefecture located in the Plateaux Region of Togo. The prefecture covers 594.7 km^{2}, with a population in 2022 of 90,505. The prefecture seat is located in Tohoun.

Cantons of Moyen-Mono include Tohoun, Kpékplémé, Tado, Saligbè, Ahassomé, and Katomé.
