= Bas-Mono Prefecture =

Prefecture in the Maritime Region of Togo

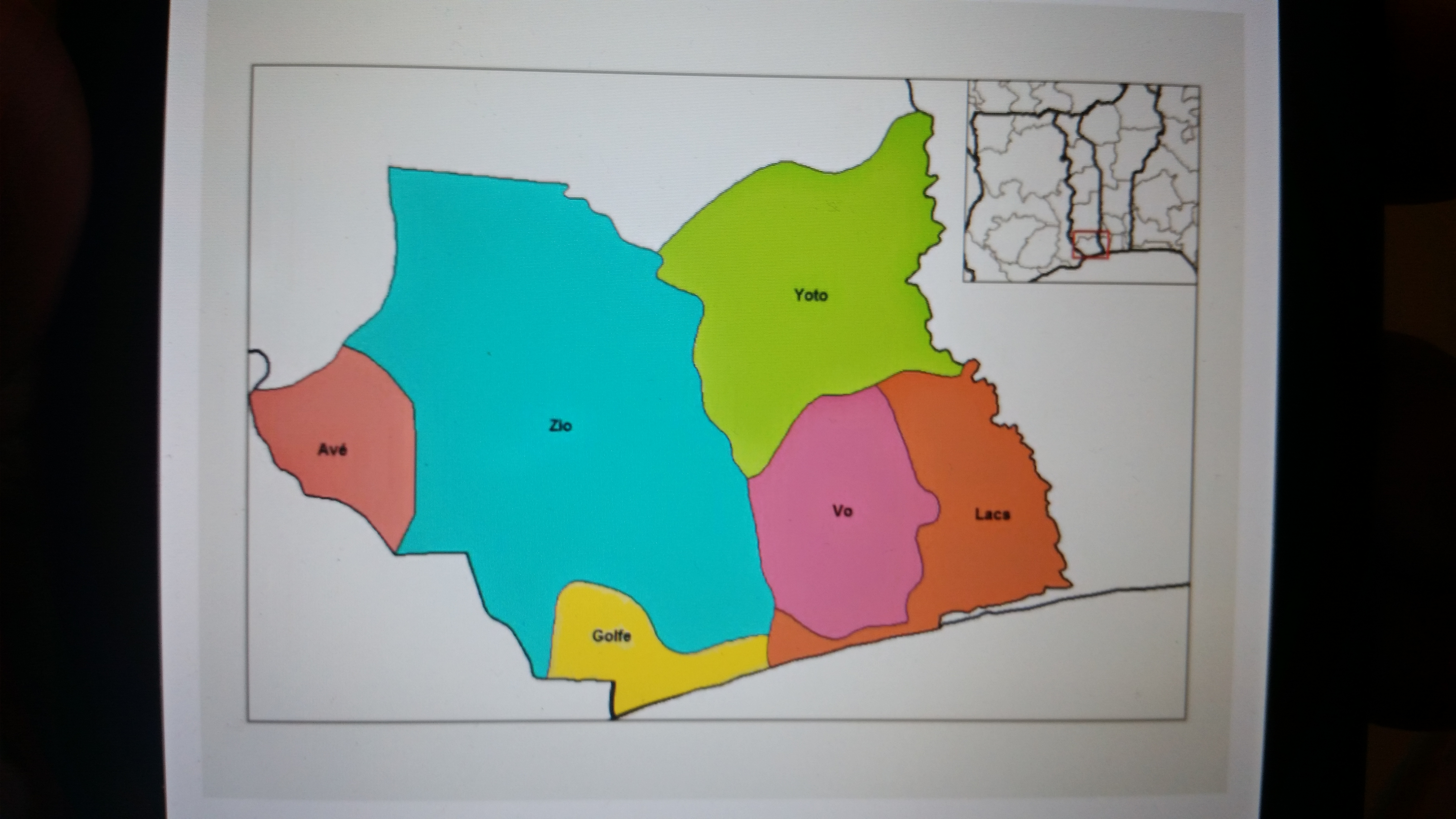
Map of Prefectures of the Maritime region of Togo.

Bas-Mono is a prefecture located in the Maritime Region of Togo. The prefecture covers 327 km^{2}, with a population in 2022 of 94,860.

Canton (administrative divisions) of Bas-Mono include Afagnagan, Agomé-Glouzou, Attitogon, Afagnan-Gbléta, Hompou, Agbétiko, and Kpétsou.
