= Djama =

Djama is a surname. Notable people with the surname include:

- Houssein Djama (born 1968), Djiboutian middle-distance runner
- Nima Djama (born 1948), Djiboutian composer and singer
- Sofia Djama (born 1979), Algerian film director
