= Kpendjal Prefecture =

Coordinates: 10°50′51″N 0°49′00″E

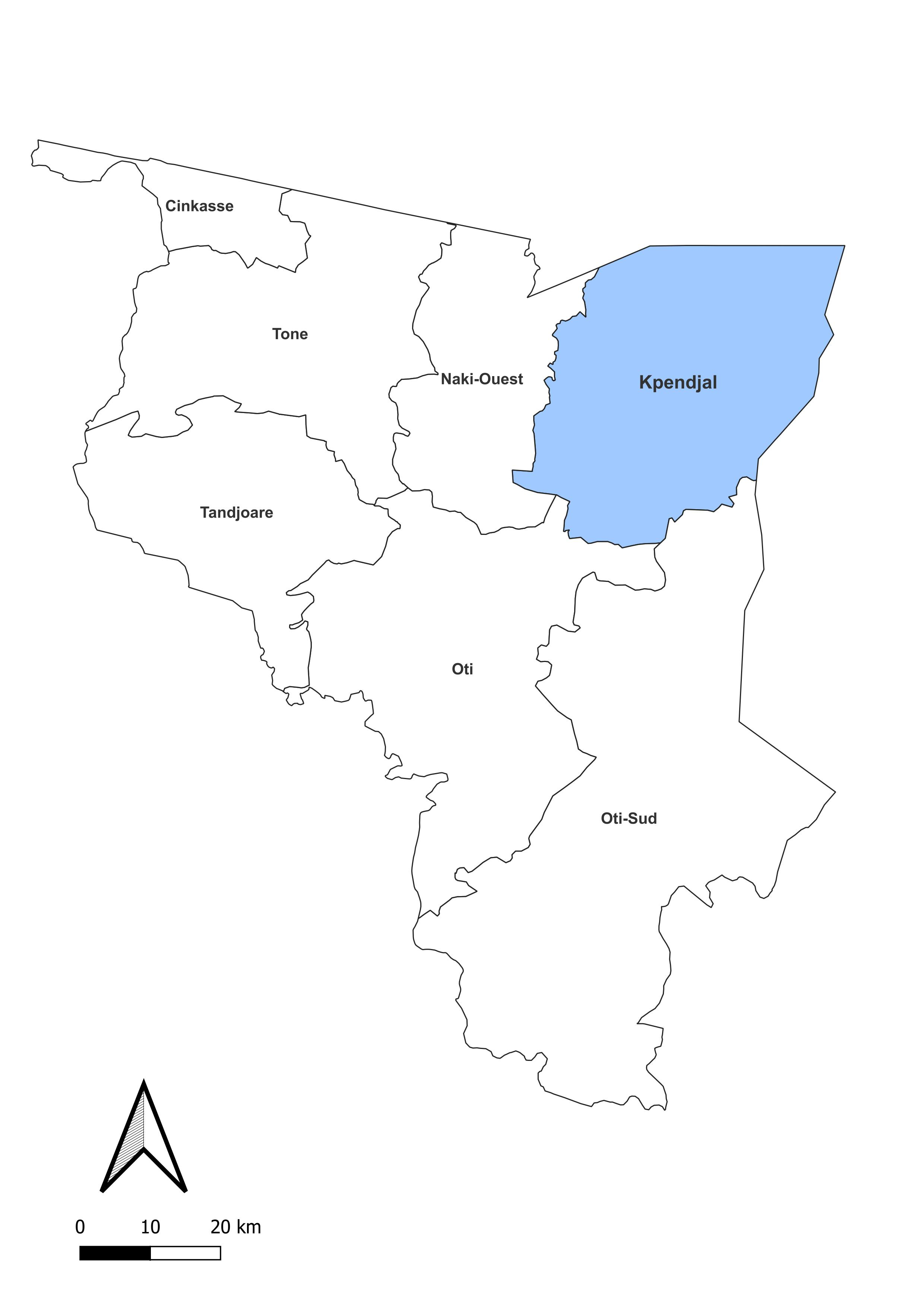
Prefectures of Savanes

Kpendjal is a prefecture located in the Savanes Region of Togo. The prefecture seat is located in Mandouri. The cantons (or subdivisions) of Kpendjal include Mandouri, Namondjoga, Pogno, Koundjoaré, Naki-Est, Borgou, Ogaro, Tambigou, Nayéga, Papri, and Tambonga.

The prefecture covers 1,385 km^{2}, with a population in 2022 of 88,365.
