= Kévé =

Kévé Keye
- Town
- Location in Togo
- Coordinates: 6.42781°N 0.924482°E

Population
  - Estimate (2009): 12,000
- Area code: 337

Kévé (also known as Keye) is a town and canton in southwest Togo with 12,000 residents.

Between 1928 and 1930, the chief of Kévé was arrested by French officials for resisting the French regime. As of 1933, Aleke was chief of the town. Kévé is located approximately 50 km northwest of Lomé. The cultural celebration of this region is Avezan or Aveza. Their region produces red wine and palm oil.
