= Yoto Prefecture =

Prefecture in the Maritime Region of Togo

Coordinates: 6.5833°N 1.5000°E

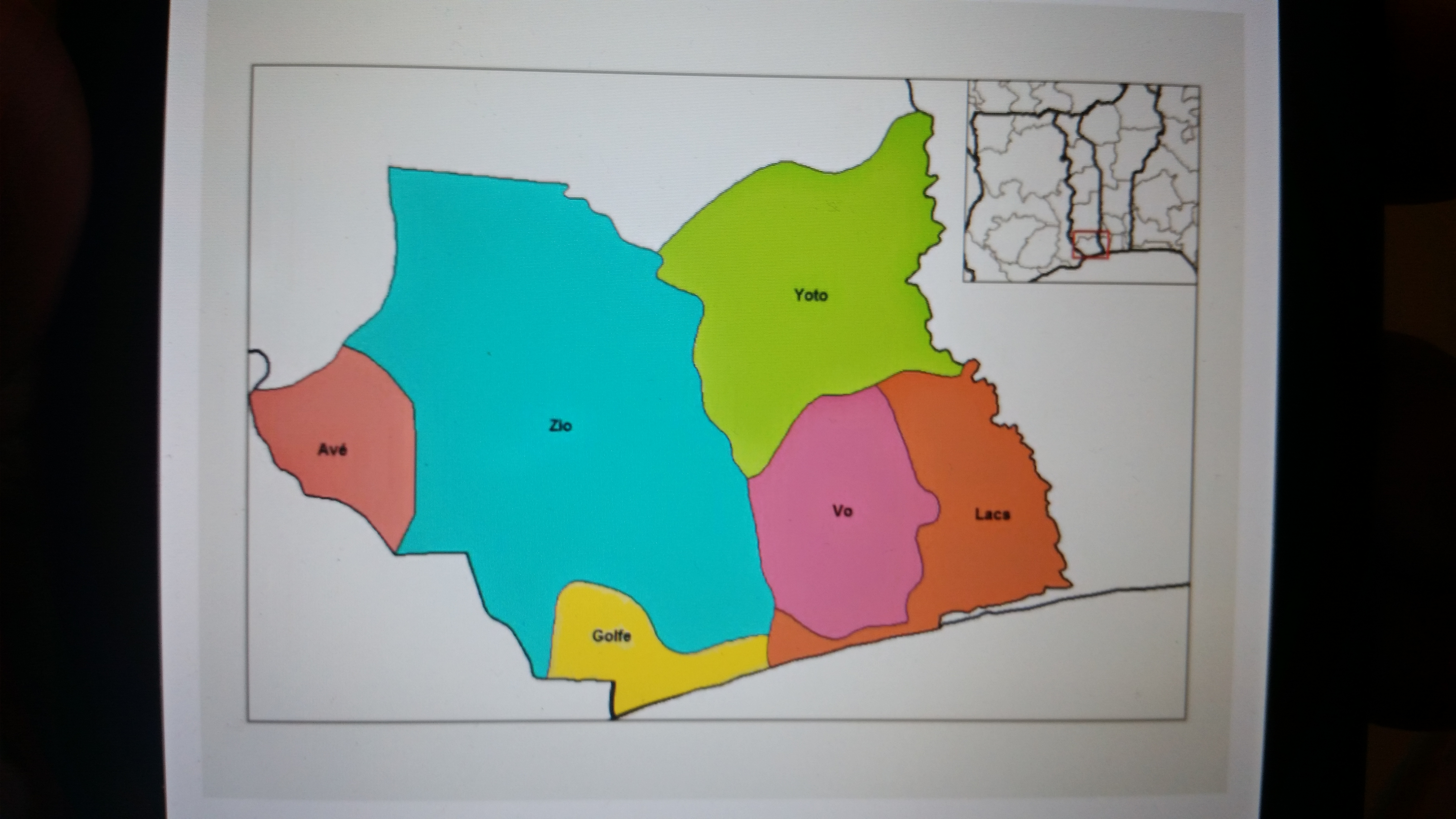
Map of Prefectures of the Maritime region of Togo.

Yoto is a prefecture located in the Maritime Region of Togo. The prefecture covers 1,258 km^{2}, with a population in 2022 of 174,851. The prefecture seat is located in Tabligbo.

Cantons (administrative divisions) of Yoto include Tabligbo, Kouvé, Gboto, Ahépé, Tokpli, Tchêkpo, Sédomé, Zafi, Kini-Kondji, Amoussimé, Essè-Godjin, and Tométy-Kondji.
