= Cinkassé Prefecture =

Prefecture of Togo

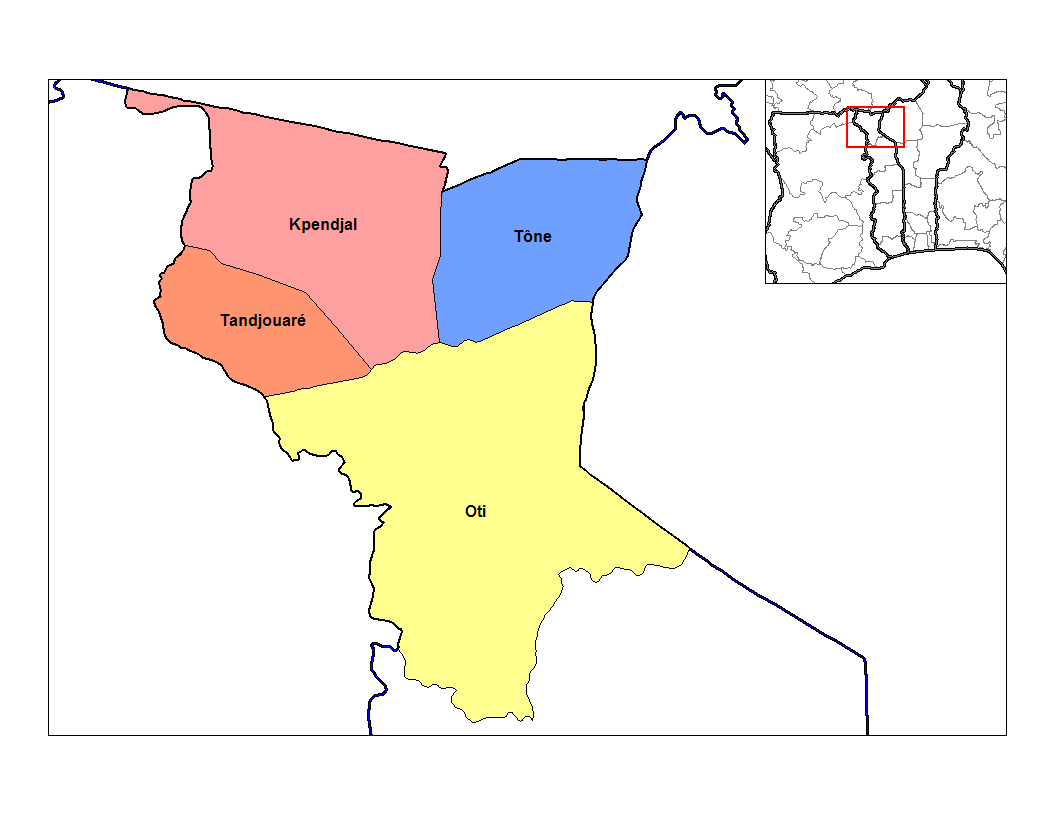
Cinkassé Prefecture is orange

Cinkassé is a prefecture located in the Savanes Region of Togo. The cantons (or subdivisions) of Cinkassé include Cinkassé, Biankouri, Timbou, Nadjoundi, Boadé, Samnaba, Noaga, Gouloungoussi. The prefecture covers 281.8 km^{2}, with a population of 128,959 in 2022.

In the far northwest of Cinkassé is a long, thin strip along the border with Burkina Faso that includes Togo's furthest north and furthest west points. In this area, which is in the western hemisphere, is Togo's only border with the Boulgou Province of Burkina Faso. The main settlement is Gouloungoussi canton, which has three villages: Gouloungoussi, Kong, and Biankouri. Just to the east of the salient the largest town in the prefecture, Cinkassé.

Timbou canton has four villages: Timbou, Djakperga, Dapaong, and Kotouri.
