= Tandjouaré Prefecture =

Prefecture of the Savanes region in Togo

Coordinates: 10°39′21″N 0°11′42″E

Tandjouaré is a prefecture located in the Savanes Region of Togo. The prefecture covers 946.1 km^{2}, with a population in 2022 of 117,969. The cantons (or subdivisions) of Tandjouaré include Bogou, Bombouaka, Tamongou, Nandoga, Loko, Sissiak, Tampialime, Doukpergou, Goundoga, Lokpanou, Nano, Pligou, Boulogou, Mamproug, Bagou, Sangou.
