= Badou =

- Location in Togo
- Coordinates: 7°35′N 0°36′E
- Country: Togo
- Region: Plateaux Region

Population (2005)
  - Total: 24,000

Badou is a town in western Togo near the Ghanaian border, in Plateaux Region. Its main industries are cocoa- and coffee-farming. The Akloa Falls lie nearby.
