= Agou Prefecture =

Coordinates: 7°28′01″N 1°55′01″E

Agou is a prefecture in the Plateaux Region of Togo. The seat town is Agou-Gadjepe. The prefecture covers 1,085 km^{2}, with a population in 2022 of 85,793.

Agou is broken down into 2 submunicipalities. Agou 1 contains the canton (administrative divisions) Agou-Tavié, Gadja, Kati, Agou-Iboé, Agou-Akplolo, Agou-Kébo, Agou-Atigbé, Agou-Nyogbo, Agou-Nyogbo-Agbétiko, Assahoun-Fiagbé, Klonou, and 10 Agou-Gadzépé. Agou 2 contains Amoussoukopé, Agotimé-Sud (Adzakpa), Agotimé-Nord 03 Amoussoukopé.

Agou was split from the Kloto prefecture.
