= Prefectures of Togo =

The Republic of Togo is divided into five regions which are subdivided into 39 prefectures. These various prefectures of Togo are shown according to their respective regions below.

== List of prefectures by region ==
=== Savanes ===
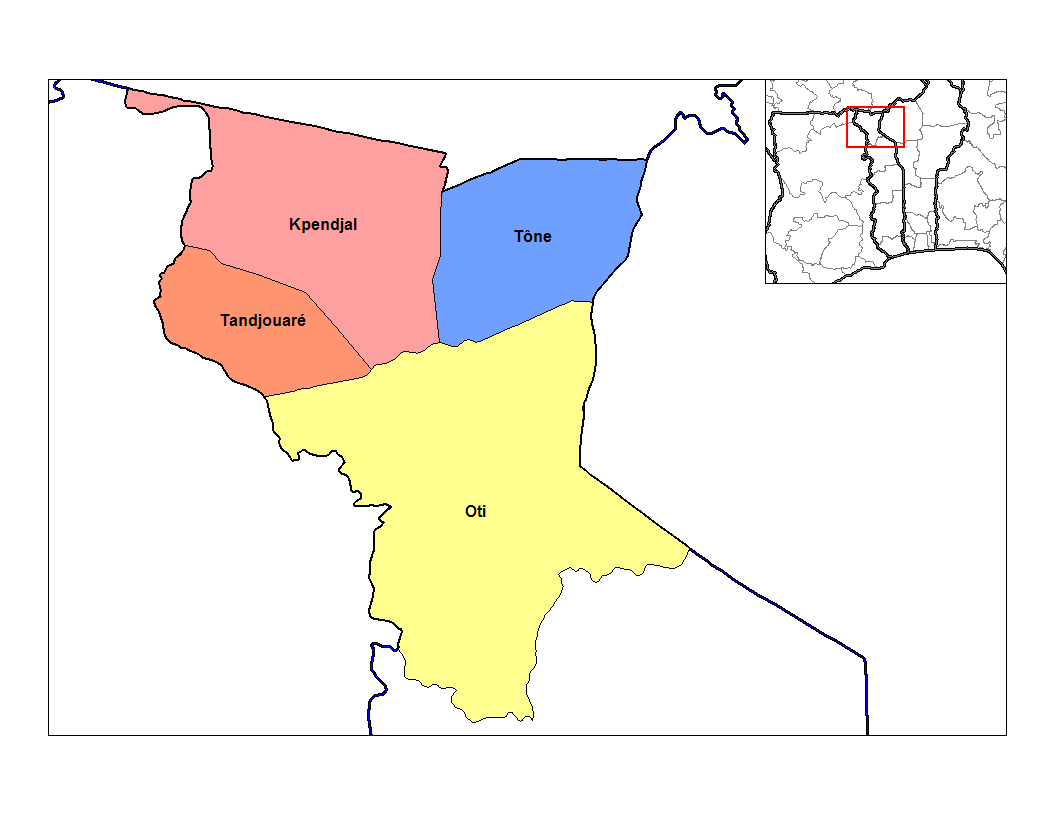
Prefectures of Savanes.

- Kpendjal Prefecture
- Oti Prefecture
- Tandjouaré Prefecture
- Tône Prefecture
- Cinkassé Prefecture
- Oti-Sud Prefecture
- Kpendjal-Ouest Prefecture

=== Kara ===
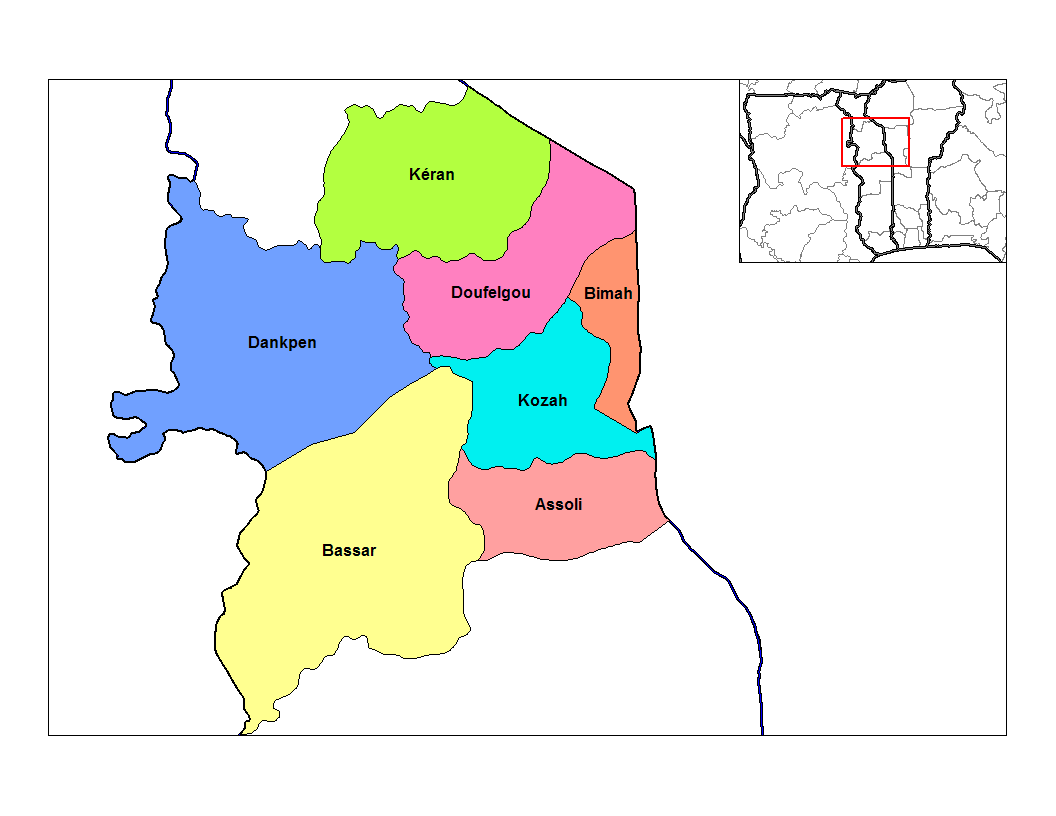
Prefectures of Kara.

- Assoli Prefecture
- Bassar Prefecture
- Bimah Prefecture (or Binah)
- Dankpen Prefecture
- Doufelgou Prefecture
- Kéran Prefecture
- Kozah Prefecture (or Koza)

=== Centrale ===
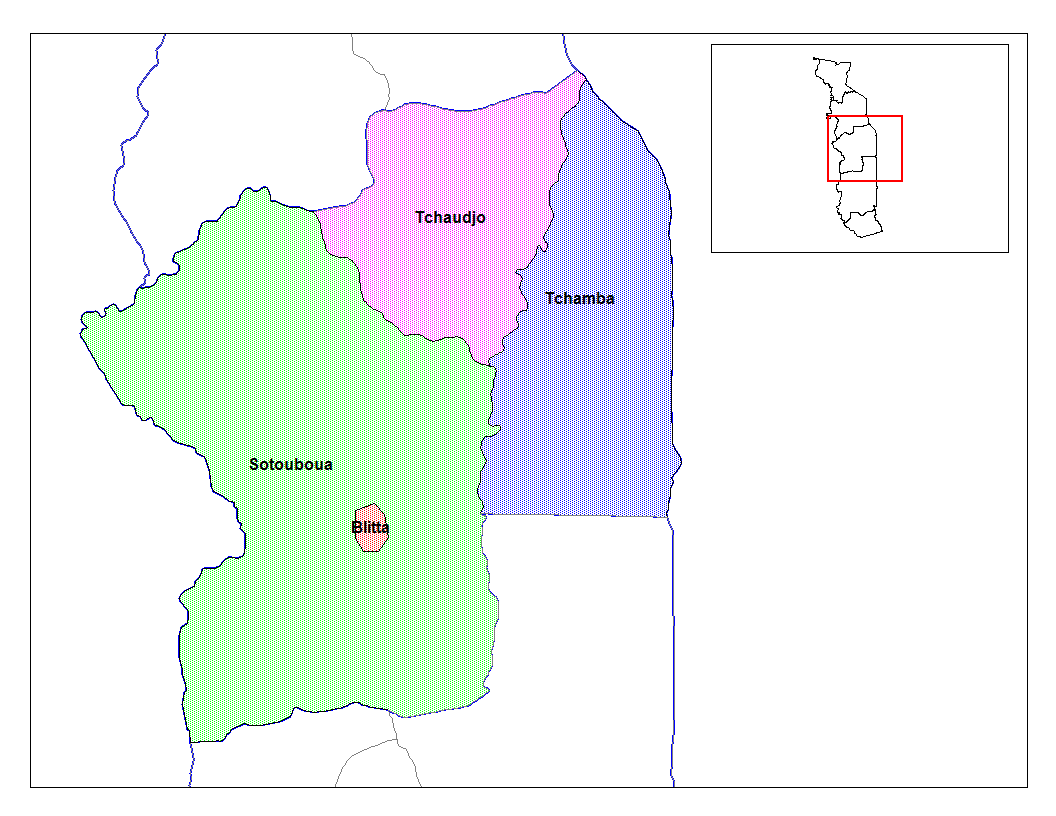
Prefectures of Centrale.

- Blitta Prefecture
- Sotouboua Prefecture
- Tchamba Prefecture
- Tchaoudjo Prefecture
- Mô Prefecture

=== Plateaux ===
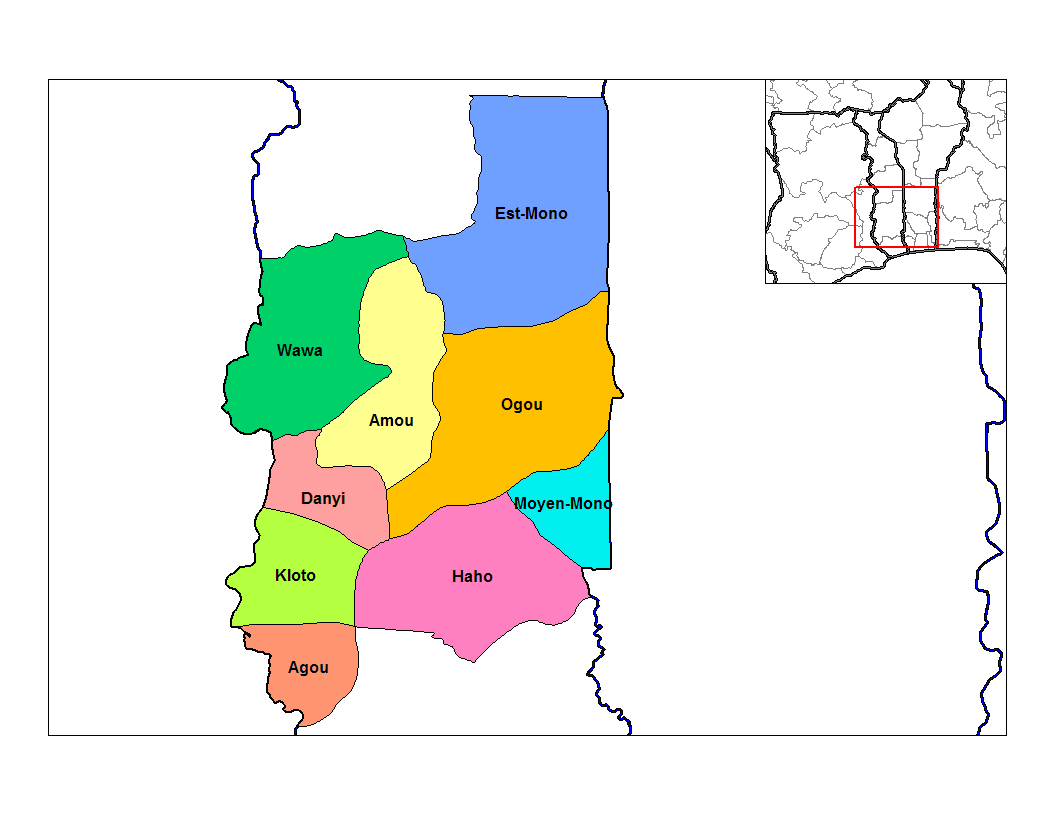
Prefectures of Plateaux.

- Agou Prefecture
- Amou Prefecture
- Danyi Prefecture
- Est-Mono Prefecture
- Haho Prefecture
- Kloto Prefecture
- Moyen-Mono Prefecture
- Ogou Prefecture
- Wawa Prefecture
- Akébou Prefecture
- Anié Prefecture
- Kpélé Prefecture

=== Maritime ===
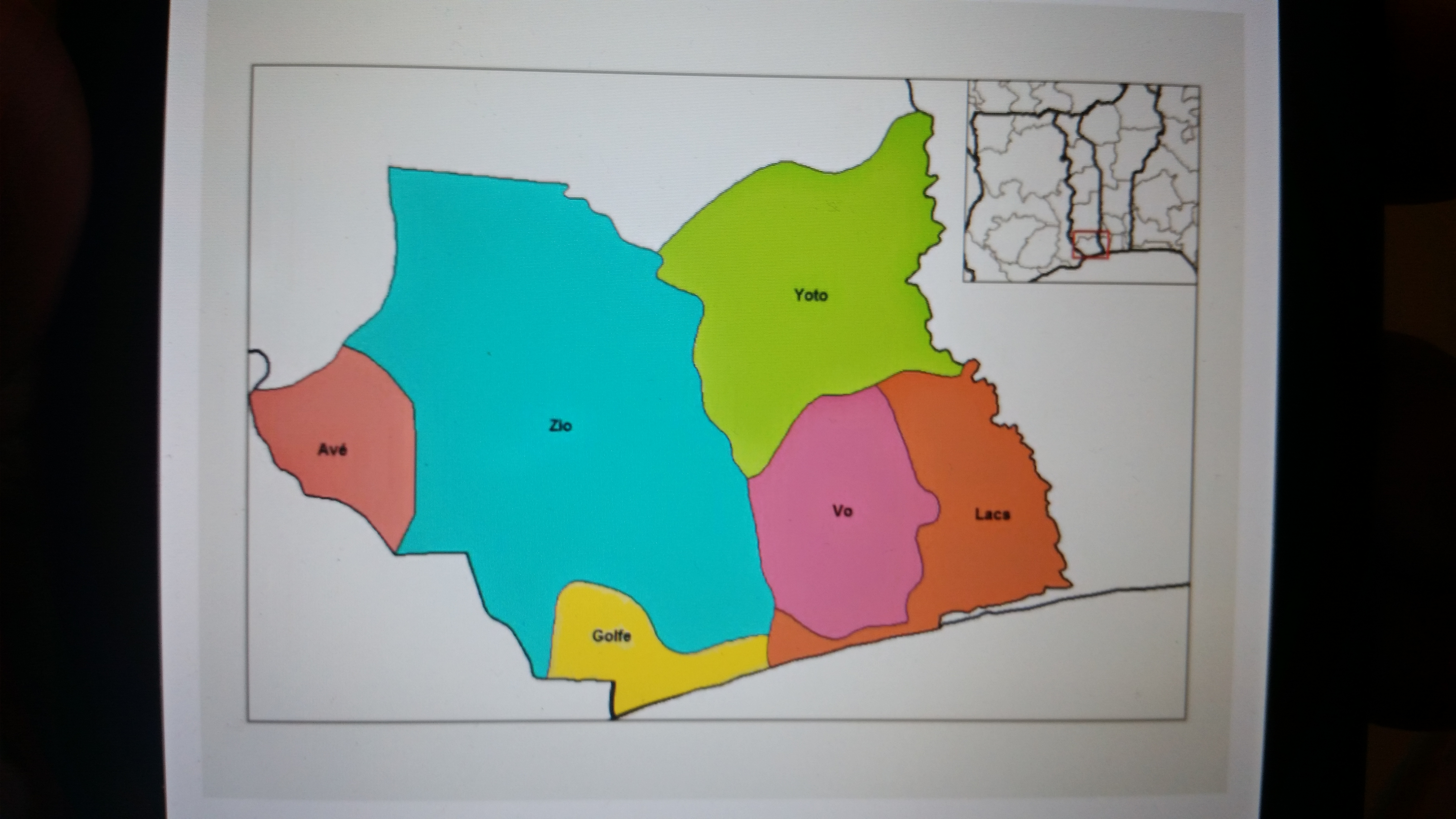
Prefectures of Maritime region of Togo.

- Avé Prefecture
- Golfe Prefecture
- Lacs Prefecture
- Vo Prefecture
- Yoto Prefecture
- Zio Prefecture
- Agoè-Nyivé Prefecture
- Bas-Mono Prefecture

== See also ==
- Regions of Togo
