= Blitta =

Coordinates: 8°19′N 0°59′E

Golfe Prefecture
- Prefecture
- Country: Togo
- Region: Centrale
- Capital: Blitta

Area
  - Total: 3,128 km^{2} (1,208 sq mi)

Population (2022 census)
  - Total: 163,272
  - Density: 52.20/km^{2} (135.2/sq mi)

Blitta is a prefecture and town located in the Centrale Region of Togo. Blitta has an area of 2,973 miles and there are roughly 200 or more villages in the area. The prefecture has a population of 163,272 inhabitants (2022 census).

The Blitta prefecture contains the canton (administrative divisions) of Blitta, Langabou, Pagala-Gare, Yégué, Tcharé-Baou, Katchenké, M’Poti, Diguengué, Tintchro, Pagala-Village, Atchintsé, Welly, Agbandi, Koffiti, Yaloumbé, Tchaloudè, Waragni, Blitta-Village, Doufouli, Tchifama, and Dikpéléou.

== History ==
Blitta is created by the settlement of several ethnic groups in the colonial period. This settlement follows three phases and was retaken by French colonizers between 1924 and 1956. The migratory movement takes its paroxysm in the year 1925 and 1928, with the construction of the railway system. The railroad has been assembled in phases by beginning in the village Agbonou (Atakpamé) and ending in Blitta, which is 112 miles long. The area has developed from once only being known as Blitta-Gare to expanding into one of the biggest areas in the Central Region. With the incorporation of the four town villages, which consist of Blitta-village, Waragni, Doufouli, and Yaloumbè. Blitta is also crossed by the National Road, which has a length of about 260 miles from Lomé to Blitta. It is the only road that goes from the main port in Lomé to the northern part of the region, so there are all types of traffic that travel on it ranging from 18-wheelers, motto's, taxis cars, bicycles, and people traveling on foot.

== Demographics ==
Blitta has grown due to the successful settlement. Initially, Blitta-Gare and Blitta-carrefour together formed the commune. This area went from about 2,611 inhabitants in the first census in 1960 to 6,636 inhabitants for the second in 1981 and 26,095 inhabitants in 2011. The new communal perimeter, includes three other villages: Doufouli, Waragni, Yaloumbe. These territories have helped increase the population as of today to 30,065 inhabitants.

There are many different ethnic groups in Blitta. The majority of ethnic groups that reside here are Kabye, Agnanga, Losso, Tem, Tchamba, Logba, Bassar, Ewe, Djerma, Moba, Peulh, and Adja.

== Religion ==
The majority of the population is Christian and Muslim. However, some citizens still practice traditional African religion. Catholicism is one of the faiths practiced by Christians here. In Blitta, there are two cathedrals, one in Blitta-Gare and the other in Blitta-Carrefour. Protestantism is another very popular faith group in Blitta. Another faith that is practiced is Jehovah's Witnesses. Islam is very prominent in Blitta among Kotokoli people.

== Festivals ==
Many festivals are performed in Blitta. The names of these celebrations are Kamou, Akpema, Kondona, Sintoudjandjagou, Kpatchama, and Boyila. Kamou is the traditional dance of the Kaybè people. This takes place during the period of harvest, which begins in December. Akpéma and Kondona are the festivals that are held for the youth. This ceremony is an initiation that every adolescent goes through to initiate them into adulthood. Sintoudjandjagou and Kpatchama rituals focus on being joyful of life and the blessing they have received throughout the year. Boyila has a literal meaning, which is to do something for tomorrow. This commemoration is a feast of yams. It takes place on the 18th of August every year. This ceremony announces the maturity of the yams. On that day, every native returns home to begin the celebration early the next morning. The drums are what announce that the feast has begun; it is called Atumpé drum call. The priest then pours Tchoukoutou, the local beer of Togo, and cooked yam with palm oil over the Gods. After eating Foufou, pounded yam the people go the main square to dance. These performances are meant to remind the community of their origin and their cultural values.

== Agriculture ==
Agriculture is the most important activity in Blitta because the majority of the population farms. They grow crops such as corn, beans, cassava, yams, millet, soy, cotton, and rice. Sometimes their stores are empty because of infertility of the land and rarity of rain. They use out dated farming tools such as hoes and machetes. The work is very difficult on the farmers. For the trade, women sell many things along the roadside such as gari, tapioca, groundnut, yams, charcoal, and cheese.

== Climate ==
The climate of Blitta is tropical and semi humid with two seasons, the rainy season and the dry season. From the beginning of April to the middle of October is the rainy season. Then at the end of October, early November the dry season begins until the following April.

== Rivers ==
The river Anié and other neighboring rivers such as You, Toulé, and Kpawa water the town of Blitta. All these rivers are characterized by seasonal variations. In the dry season the flow of the rivers are at zero. At this time the people of Blitta really suffer because the water level is so scarce.

== Infrastructure ==
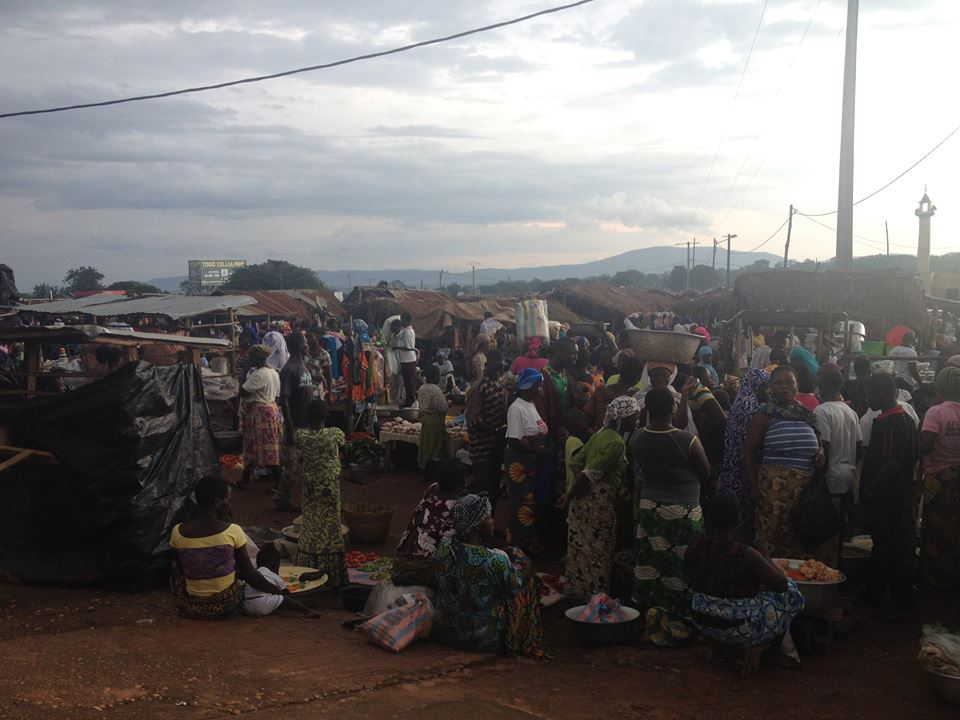

There are two markets that are held in Blitta. One of the markets is in Blitta-Gare, which is opened every Friday. The other market is located in Blitta-Carrfour and is held every Sunday. In these markets you can find anything from yams, corn, beans, goats, chickens, to school supplies and clothes. It is Blitta's shopping mall. Tchoukoutou, Togo's local beer is also a big commodity sold here. Both markets are easily accessible no matter where you are in Blitta. For people needing a place to stay, there are couple of hotels in Blitta: Sapin, Boyila, le balafon, le Campement... There is also a cultural center in Blitta-Gare that holds conferences and most of the town's festivals.

== Communication ==
Blitta has only one way to announce information, The Radio Etincèle. This radio station was created in 2001 and is on the air everyday from 5 AM to 10 PM. It is located in Blitta-Gare, across from the high school, Lycée de Blitta.

== Education ==
Blitta is a town of many schools that still need improvement to their education system. There are not enough schools for the children to attend to lower class sizes, which would advance their educational experience. There is one senior high school called Lyceé de Blitta, three secondary schools, two of which are in Blitta-Gare.

== Health Facilities ==
There are two hospitals in this region. The main hospital is located in Blitta-Gare. This facility can provide many services to the community. There is a smaller clinic located in Blitta-Carrfour. Many technical services cannot be handled here.

== See also ==
- Railway stations in Togo
