= Plateaux Region, Togo =

Region of Togo

Coordinates: 7°30′N 1°06′E

Plateaux
- Region
- Plateaux Region
- Country: Togo
- Capital: Atakpamé

Area
  - Total: 16,975 km^{2} (6,554 sq mi)

Population (2022 census)
  - Total: 1,635,946
  - Density: 96.374/km^{2} (249.61/sq mi)
- HDI (2017): 0.471 low · 4th

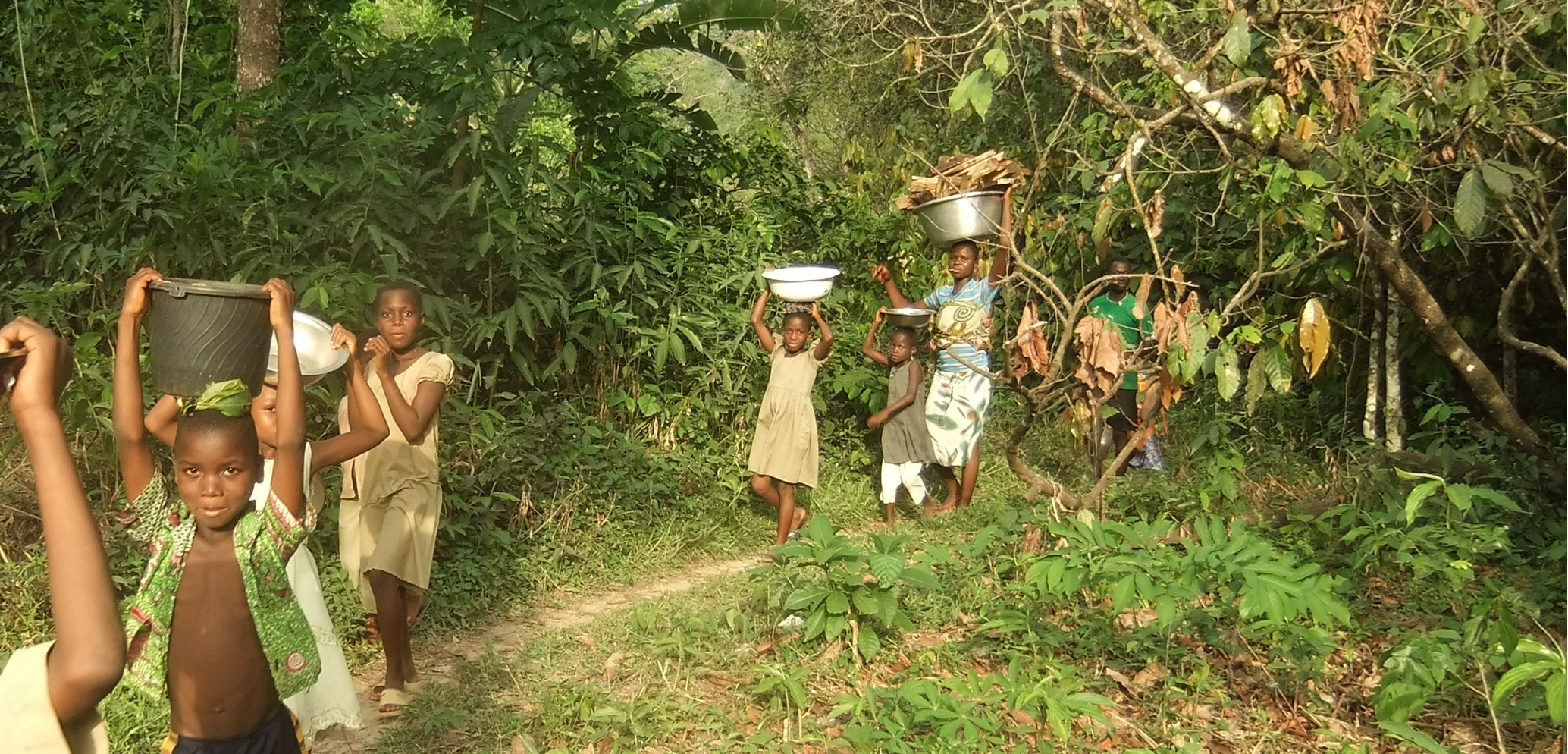
Forêt classée des Deux Bena (forest reserve)

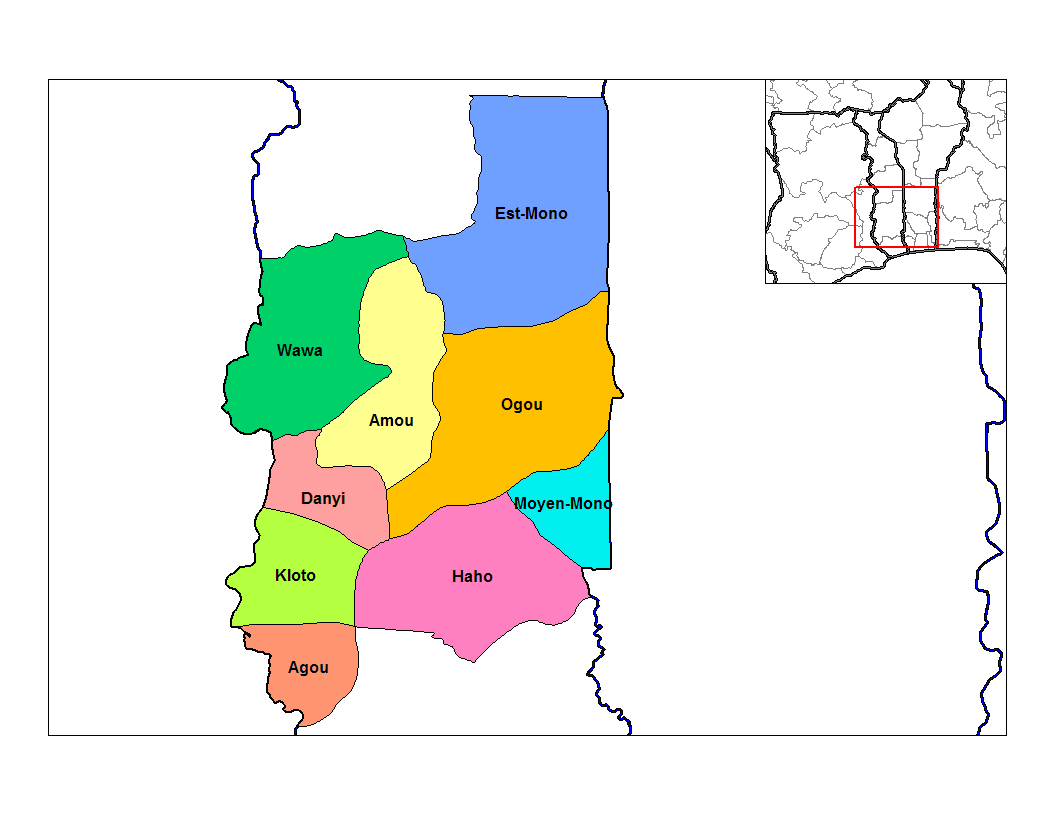
Prefectures of Plateaux

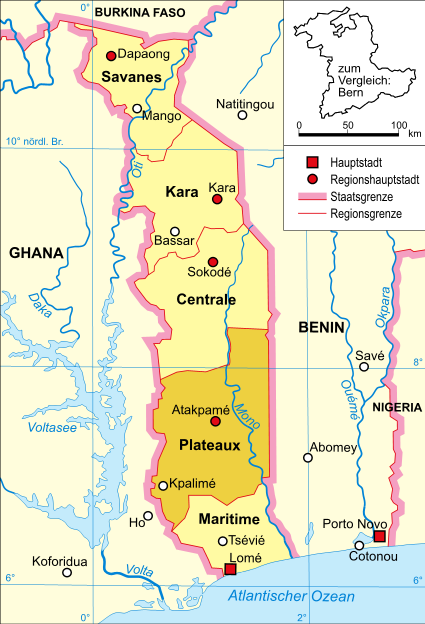
Plateaux Region

Plateaux Region (French: Région des Plateaux) is one of Togo's five regions.

Atakpamé is the regional capital. It is the largest region in terms of area and has the second largest population (after the Maritime Region). Other major cities in the Plateaux region include Kpalimé and Badou. The highest point of the country, Mount Agou, is located within this region.

Plateaux is located north of Maritime Region and south of Centrale Region. In the west, it borders the Volta Region of Ghana, and in the east it borders three departments of Benin: Collines to the northeast; Zou to the east; and Kouffo to the southeast.

Plateaux is divided into the prefectures of:

- Agou Prefecture
- Amou Prefecture
- Danyi Prefecture
- Est-Mono Prefecture
- Haho Prefecture
- Kloto Prefecture
- Moyen-Mono Prefecture
- Ogou Prefecture
- Wawa Prefecture

== See also ==
- Regions of Togo
