= Savanes Region, Togo =

Region of Togo

Coordinates: 10°30′N 0°30′E

Savanes
- Region
- Savanes Region
- Country: Togo
- Capital: Dapaong

Area
  - Total: 8,470 km^{2} (3,270 sq mi)

Population (2022 census)
  - Total: 1,143,520
  - Density: 135/km^{2} (350/sq mi)
- Time zone: UTC±00:00 (GMT)
- HDI (2017): 0.421 low · 6th

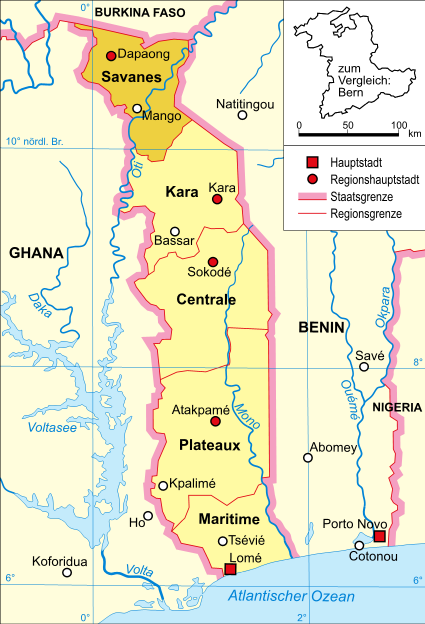
Savanes Region

Savanes Region (French: Région des Savanes) is the northernmost of the five Regions of Togo. Dapaong is the regional capital and largest city. Another major town in the region is Mango.

Savanes is divided into the prefectures of Cinkassé, Kpendjal, Kpendjal-Ouest, Oti, Oti-Sud, Tandjouaré, and Tône.

To the south of Savanes is Kara Region, its only domestic border. It shares borders with the following foreign areas:

- Northern Region, Ghana: southwest
- Upper East Region, Ghana: west
- Boulgou Province, Burkina Faso: far northwest
- Koulpélogo Province, Burkina Faso: northwest
- Kompienga Province, Burkina Faso: northeast
- Atakora Department, Benin: east

Savanes is the only region that borders Burkina Faso.

== See also ==
- Regions of Togo
