= Centrale Region, Togo =

Region of Togo

Coordinates: 8°36′N 1°06′E

Centrale
- Region
- Centrale Region of Togo
- Country: Togo
- Capital: Sokodé

Area
  - Total: 13,101 km^{2} (5,058 sq mi)

Population (2022 census)
  - Total: 795,529
  - Density: 60.723/km^{2} (157.27/sq mi)
- HDI (2017): 0.489 low · 3rd

Centrale Region (French: Région Centrale) is one of Togo's five regions. Sokodé is the regional capital. Centrale is the least populated region in Togo with a total of 795,529 people according to a census done in 2022.

Other major cities in the Centrale region include Tchamba and Sotouboua.

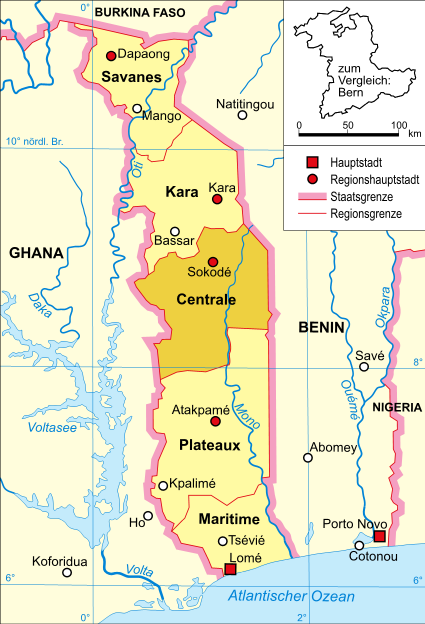
Centrale Region

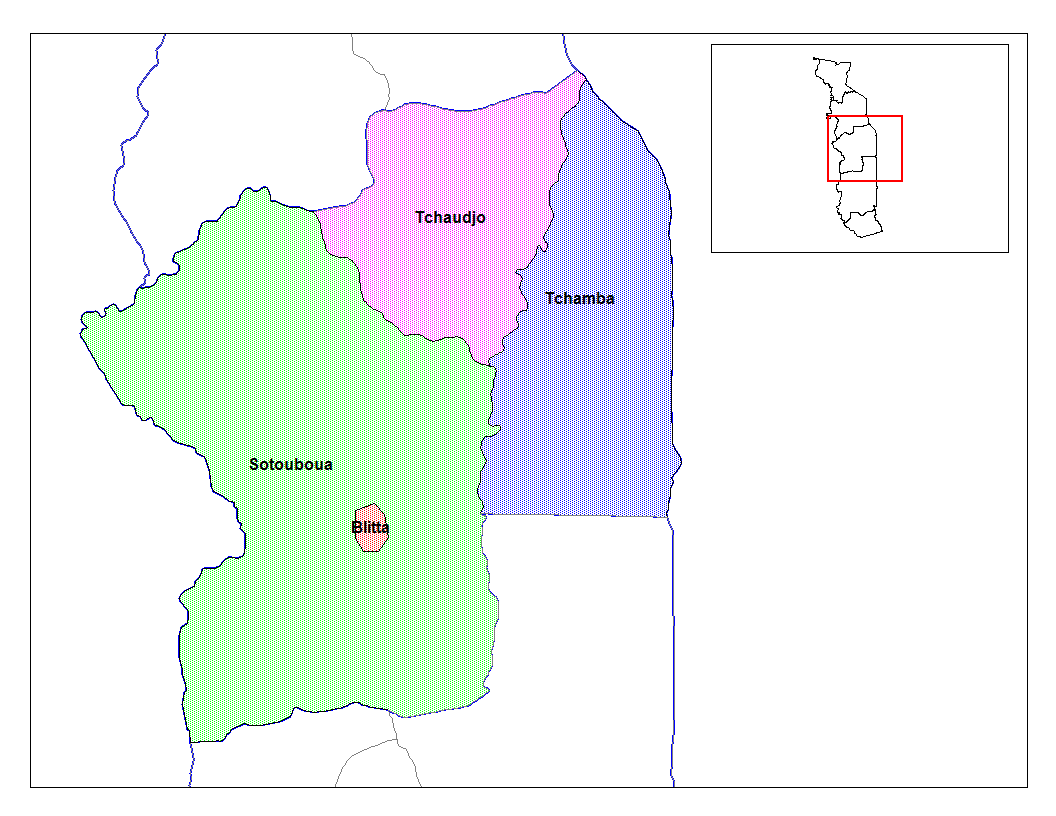
Prefectures of Centrale Region

Centrale is divided into the prefectures of Blitta, Sotouboua, Tchamba, and Tchaoudjo.

Centrale is located north of Plateaux Region and south of Kara Region. Like the rest of the regions of Togo, it borders Ghana in the west and Benin in the east — specifically the Northern Region in the northwest and the Volta Region in the southwest, and the Donga Department in the northeast and the Collines Department in the southeast.

== See also ==
- Regions of Togo
