= List of cities in Togo =

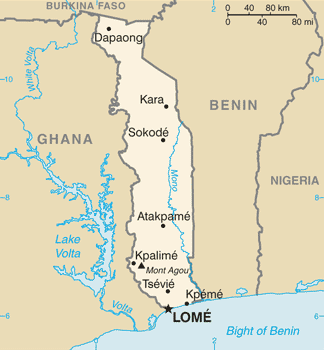
Map of Togo

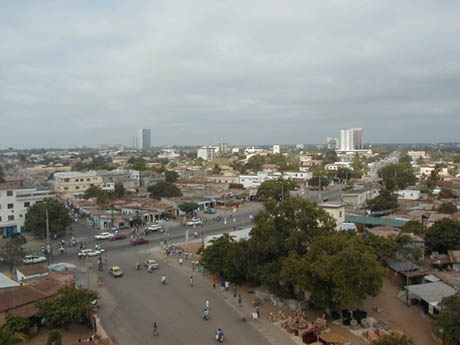
Lomé, Capital of Togo

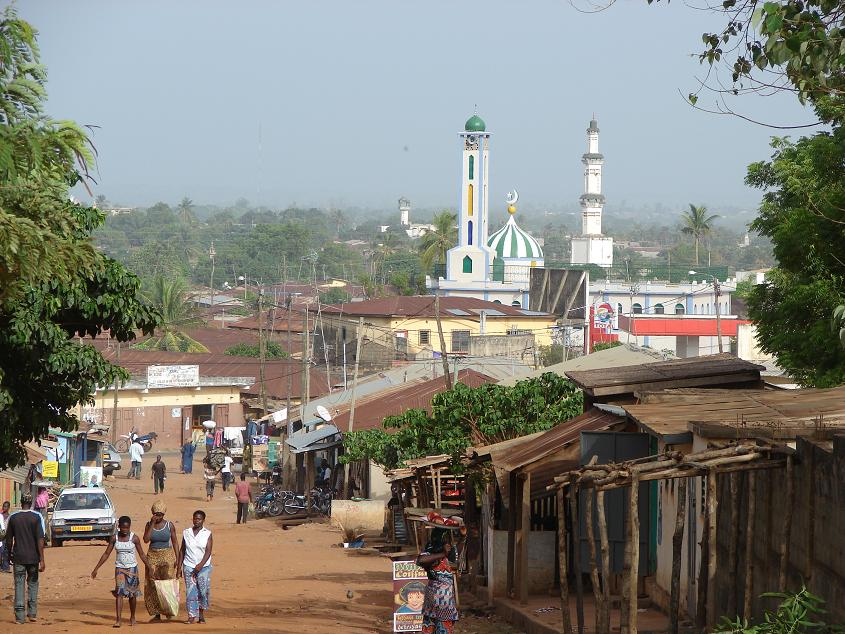
Sokodé

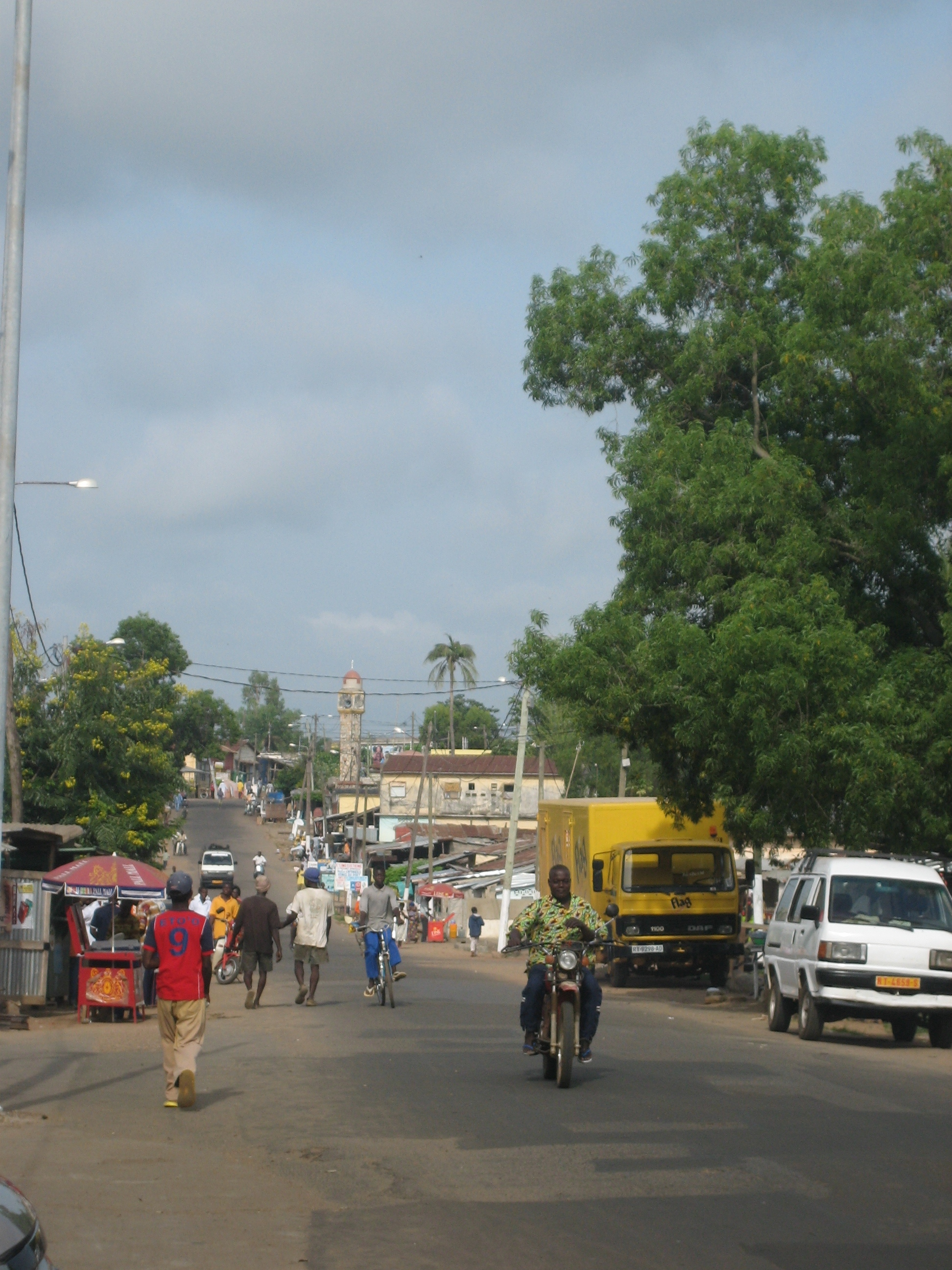
Kara

This is a list of cities and towns in Togo.

== List ==
=== By population ===
Rank	City	Population 1981 census	Population 2010 census	Region
1.	Lomé	390,000	1,477,658	Maritime
2.	Sokodé	45,660	95,070	Centrale
3.	Kara	28,902	94,878	Kara
4.	Kpalimé	28,262	75,084	Plateaux
5.	Atakpamé	24,139	69,261	Plateaux
6.	Bassar	17,867	23,181	Kara
7.	Tsévié	20,480	54,474	Maritime
8.	Aného	14,368	24,891	Maritime
9.	Mango	12,894	24,766	Savanes
10.	Benin	16,939	58,071	Savanes
11.	Tchamba	12,911	22,970	Centrale
12.	Niamtougou	12,444	21,250	Kara
13.	Bafilo	12,060	17,937	Kara
14.	Notsé	8,916	35,039	Plateaux
15.	Sotouboua	10,590	24,332	Centrale
16.	Vogan	11,260	17,340	Maritime
17.	Badou	8,111	12,003	Plateaux
18.	Biankouri		15,562	Savanes
19.	Tabligbo	7,526	22,304	Maritime
20.	Kandé	6,134	12,970	Kara
21.	Amlamé	3,997	9,870	Plateaux
22.	Galangachi		9,632	Savanes
23.	Kpagouda	4,112	7,686	Kara

=== Other places ===
- Adeta
- Agbodrafo
- Cinkassé
- Kambole
- Ketao
- Tandjouare
- Togoville

== See also ==
- Geography of Togo
