= List of rivers of Togo =

List of rivers in Togo

This is a list of rivers in Togo. This list is arranged by drainage basin, with respective tributaries indented under each larger stream's name.

== Gulf of Guinea ==
- Volta River (Ghana)
  - Todzie River
  - Oti River (Pendjari River)
    - Arli River
      - Doubodo River
      - Moribonga River
    - Mo River
      - Katassou River
    - Kara River
      - Kawa River
      - Kpelou River
      - Mio River
    - Kpasa River
    - Koumongou River
      - Kéran River
    - Koulpélogo River
    - Rivière River
    - Singou River
    - Toubili River
- Mono River
  - Amou River
    - Amoutchou River
    - Oulou River
  - Anie River
  - Couffo River
  - Gbaga Canal
    - Lake Togo
      - Haho River
      - Sio River
  - Khra River
  - Nokpoué River
  - Nymassila
  - Ogou River
- Zio River
