= Losso people =

West African ethnic group

Losso Home & Migration Map

The Nawdba, sing. Nawda, to whom some refer as Lossos in Togo, are an ethnic and linguistic group of people living in the Doufelgou District (Préfecture) of the Kara Region in Northern Togo, West Africa. The district capital is Niamtougou which is also an important regional market town. The Nawdba live on a plateau in the Togo Mountains between two mountain ranges: the Kabiyé Mountains to the South and the Défalé Chain to the North. They occupy the communities of Niamtougou, Koka, Baga, Ténéga, Siou, Djogrergou, Sioudouga, Kpadeba, Hago, Koukou, and Kounfaga. The Doufelgou District is bordered by the Kozah District to the South, by the Binah District to the East, by the Bassar District to the West, by the Kéran District to the North, and by the international border with Bénin to the Northeast.

== People ==
The Nawdba are primarily engaged in subsistence farming and small animal husbandry, especially chickens, guinea fowl, goats, pigs, and sheep. They grow millet and sorghum that they make into a thick porridge (la pâte) that is the staple of their diet and that they brew into a thick low-alcohol beer called daam. They also grow yams and cassava, groundnuts (peanuts), beans, and fonio. In the late 1800s, early European explorers such as the ethnographer, Leo Frobenius, baptized them the "palm tree people" because of the concentration of oil palm trees in their home area.

The Nawdba have migrated in search of fertile available land to the area along the North-South National Road No. 1 between Sokodé and Notsé, where they have founded numerous communities. In addition, they have migrated to Togo's capital city, Lomé, and to Accra, the capital of Ghana, in search of wage employment. They have also migrated to the Plateau Region of Togo and the Volta Region of Ghana precisely in the actual Oti Region where they work as sharecroppers in coffee and cocoa plantations. Nawdba men served in the colonial armies of Germany, Britain, and France as well as in the Ghanaian and Togolese armies in the years following the independences of the two countries.

== Language ==
The Nawdba call themselves Nawda (singular) or Nawdba (plural), and their language is Nawdm. There are approximately 190,000 native speakers of Nawdm in Togo and 8,000 speakers in Ghana. Nawdm most closely resembles the Yom language of the Pila-Pila and Tanéka people who live near the city of Djougou in the Donga Province (comprising the Southern portion of the old Atakora Department) of Northern Bénin. Nawdm and Yom, like Mòoré, the language of the Mossi people of Burkina Faso, are classified under the Oti-Volta sub-group of languages in the Gur (or Voltaique) group of the Niger-Congo languages.

"Losso" is a name used to refer normally to both Lambas and Nawdba. To refer to someone who is not a Nawda, they use the word Lama. The origin of the name "Losso" or "Lossotu" is unclear and may have its origins in the name that their Kabyé neighbors called them. Confusion arose and has continued when the name "Losso" was attributed by Togo's French colonial administrations to all residents of what is now the Doufelgou District, regardless of their ethnic or linguistic affiliation. That is to say that an entire ethnic group is now being referred to by a name that has no meaning and makes no sense to them because of colonial practices of broad generalization and categorization. Residents of Yaka, Agbandé, Kadjalla, Alloum, Léon, Défalé, Massédéna, Pouda, and other villages in the Doufelgou District speak languages generally classified together as Lamba, but have also been called Losso by the colonial administration. While there has been considerable mutual influence between the Nawdba and their closest neighbors, the Kabyé and the Lambas, their languages do not resemble each other and are not mutually intelligible.

== History ==
Like most of Togo's ethnic groups, the Nawdba claim to be the original inhabitants of their region. Also like other groups, their formal tradition states that the original Nawdba descended from Mossi tribe in the country known today as Burkina Faso. The original inhabitants were in each case a man replete with bow and arrows, hoe, and other tools of his gender and a woman also carrying the tools appropriate to her roles.

Informally, many older Nawdba stated that the Nawdba came "from the East, toward Djougou (in Bénin)." This statement is supported by the close relationship between Nawdm and the Yom language of the region near Djougou. The apparent similarity between the Yom-Nawdm languages and Mooré of Burkina Faso suggested that the Nawdba, Pila-Pila, Tanéka, and perhaps the Woaba peoples may have a common origin in what is today Burkina Faso. The Nawdba were thought to be the last elements of a migration from the East that infiltrated into the plateau between the mountain ridge home of the Lamba to the North and the mountain ridge home of the Kabyé to the South.

More recent scholarship has increased knowledge of the origins of the Nawdba. The founders of Niamtougou have been identified as a man named Kégidimgbada and his wife Iya. Researchers have concluded that the 35% lexical similarity that was identified between the Nawdm and Mòoré languages is sufficient to confirm a common ancestry between the Mossi and the Nawdba, Pila-Pila, and Tanéka peoples. It does not support the idea, however, that the latter are offshoots of the Mossi nor that their languages have their origins in Mòoré. Further study of the Nawdm language has determined that informants who stated that the Nawdba came from the sky may actually have been saying that they came from the North. Researchers have concluded that the Nawdba immigration into their present home area probably began in the 15th Century and came in waves from the North and East rather than in a single movement.
