= Demographics of Togo =

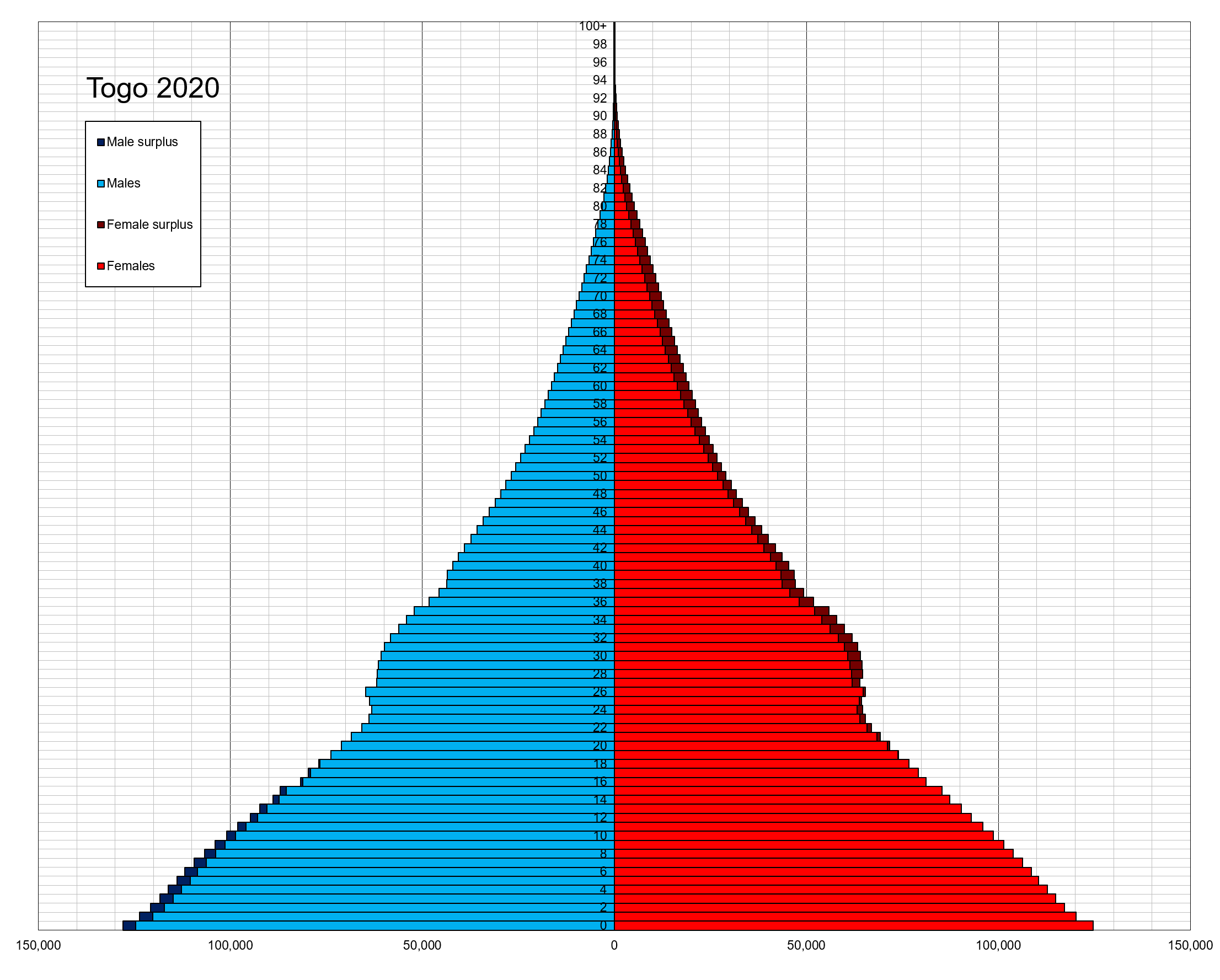
- Population pyramid of Togo in 2020
- Population: 8,049,233 (2022 est.)
- Growth rate: 2.48% (2022 est.)
- Birth rate: 31.86 births/1,000 population (2022 est.)
- Death rate: 5.27 deaths/1,000 population (2022 est.)
- Life expectancy: 71.36 years
  - male: 68.76 years
  - female: 74.03 years
- Fertility rate: 4.23 children born/woman (2022 est.)
- Infant mortality: 41.19 deaths/1,000 live births
- Net migration rate: -1.81 migrant(s)/1,000 population (2022 est.)

Age structure
- 0–14 years: 39.73%
- 65 and over: 3.57%

Nationality
- Nationality: Togolese

Language
- Official: French

The demographics of Togo include ethnicity, population density, age, education level, health, economic status and religious affiliations.

Togo's population is estimated to have grown to four times its size between 1960 and 2010. With nearly 60% of its populace under the age of 25 and a high annual growth rate attributed largely to high fertility, Togo's population is likely to continue to expand for the foreseeable future. Reducing fertility, boosting job creation, and improving education will be essential to reducing the country's high poverty rate. In 2008, Togo eliminated primary school enrolment fees, leading to higher enrolment but increased pressure on limited classroom space, teachers, and materials. Togo has a good chance of achieving universal primary education, but educational quality, the underrepresentation of girls, and the low rate of enrolment in secondary and tertiary schools remain concerns.

== Population ==
Population distribution is very uneven due to soil and terrain variations. The population is generally concentrated in the south and along the major north-south highway connecting the coast to the Sahel. Age distribution is also uneven; nearly one-half of Togolese are less than fifteen years old.

French, the official language, is used in administration and documentation. The public primary schools combine French with Ewe or Kabye as languages of instruction, depending on the region. English is spoken in neighboring Ghana and is taught in Togolese secondary schools. As a result, many Togolese, especially in the south and along the Ghana border, speak some English.

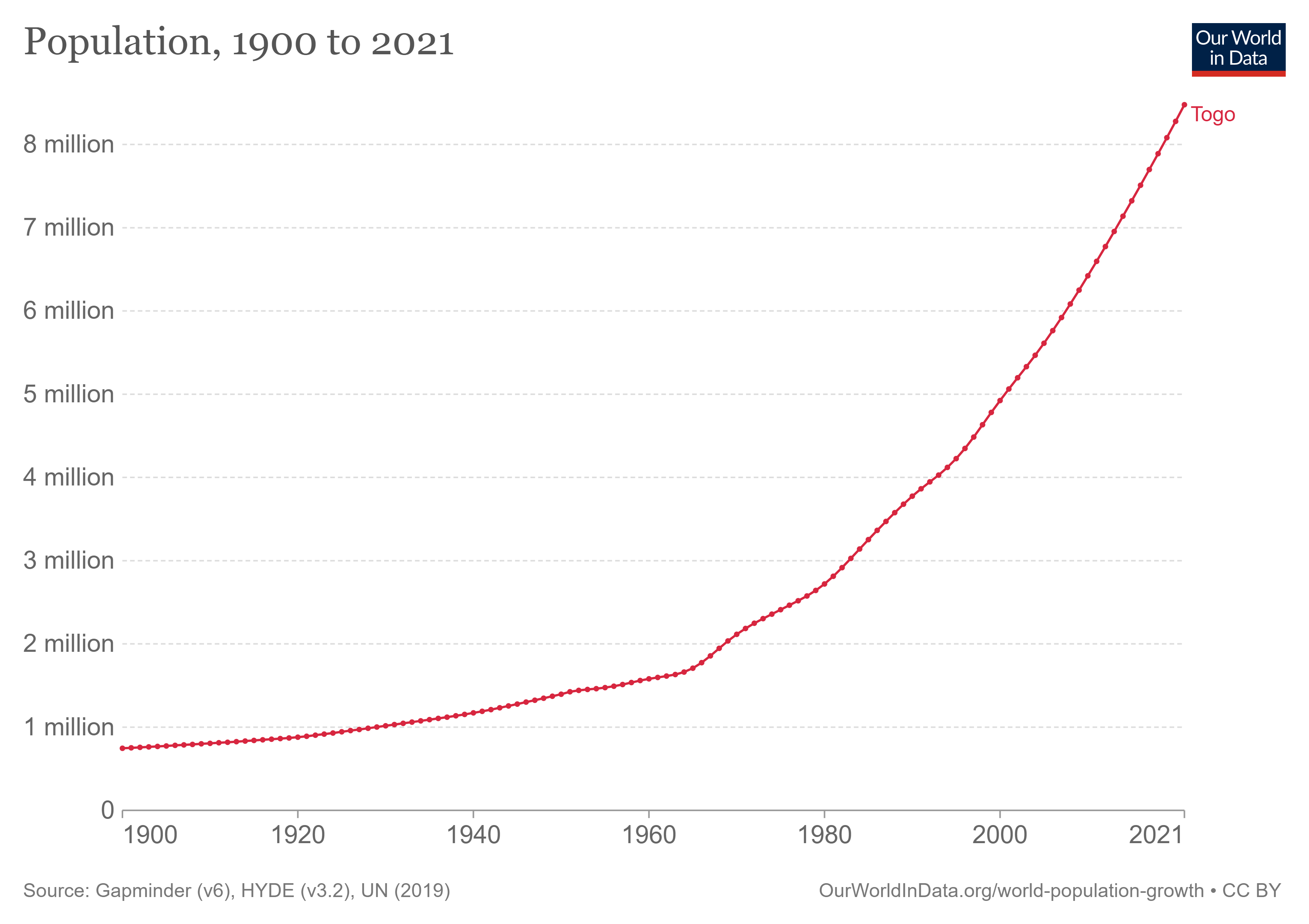
Demographics of Togo; Number of inhabitants in thousands.

Population census results
Census date	Population	Average annual growth (%)	Population density/km^{2}	Proportion urban (%)
1-11-1958	1,444,481	.	25	9.4
1-3-1970	1,950,646	2.7	34	21.2
22-11-1981	2,719,567	2.9	48	25.2
6-11-2010	6,191,155	2.9	109	37.7

According to the 2022 revision of the World Population Prospects the total population was 8,644,829 in 2021, compared to only 1 395 000 in 1950. The proportion of children below the age of 15 in 2010 was 39.6%, 56.9% was between 15 and 65 years of age, while 3.4% was 65 years or older .

	Total population	Population aged 0–14 (%)	Population aged 15–64 (%)	Population aged 65+ (%)
1950	1 395 000	41.3	54.4	4.3
1955	1 475 000	41.9	54.1	3.9
1960	1 578 000	42.6	53.8	3.6
1965	1 700 000	43.6	53.1	3.3
1970	2 097 000	44.8	52.1	3.1
1975	2 380 000	45.9	51.1	3.1
1980	2 667 000	46.6	50.3	3.1
1985	3 161 000	46.7	50.2	3.1
1990	3 666 000	46.0	50.9	3.1
1995	4 085 000	44.8	52.1	3.1
2000	4 794 000	43.2	53.6	3.1
2005	5 408 000	41.5	55.2	3.3
2010	6 028 000	39.6	56.9	3.4

Population by Sex and Age Group (Census 06.XI.2010):

Age group	Male	Female	Total	%
Total	3 009 095	3 182 060	6 191 155	100
0–4	456 524	444 747	901 271	14.56
5–9	482 501	469 199	951 700	15.37
10–14	390 477	357 249	747 726	12.08
15–19	313 257	293 144	606 401	9.79
20–24	252 807	292 438	545 245	8.81
25–29	214 803	282 019	496 822	8.02
30–34	199 636	224 744	424 380	6.85
35–39	166 528	185 480	352 008	5.69
40–44	139 731	151 853	291 584	4.71
45–49	112 191	116 255	228 446	3.69
50–54	82 969	95 264	178 233	2.88
55–59	54 936	61 014	115 950	1.87
60–64	44 431	58 263	102 694	1.66
65-69	26 700	39 624	66 324	1.07
70-74	24 127	37 629	61 756	1.00
75-79	13 250	20 324	33 574	0.54
80+	27 960	45 631	73 591	1.19
Age group	Male	Female	Total	Percent
0–14	1 329 502	1 271 195	2 600 697	42.01
15–64	1 581 289	1 760 474	3 341 763	53.98
65+	92 037	143 208	235 245	3.80
Unknown	6 267	7 183	13 450	0.22

Population Estimates by Sex and Age Group (Estimates 01.VII.2020) (Post-censal estimates.):

Age group	Male	Female	Total	%
Total	3 805 683	3 990 457	7 796 140	100
0–4	554 653	546 731	1 101 384	14.13
5–9	492 306	493 409	985 715	12.64
10–14	448 624	446 196	894 820	11.48
15–19	466 008	454 136	920 144	11.80
20–24	371 183	342 666	713 848	9.16
25–29	298 580	294 682	593 262	7.61
30–34	238 519	288 749	527 267	6.76
35–39	209 365	274 289	483 654	6.20
40–44	183 861	207 689	391 550	5.02
45–49	148 891	169 758	318 648	4.09
50–54	119 249	131 375	250 624	3.21
55–59	91 263	100 293	191 556	2.46
60–64	59 540	71 641	131 181	1.68
65-69	49 132	59 692	108 823	1.40
70-74	33 591	45 314	78 905	1.01
75-79	20 494	30 733	51 226	0.66
80+	20 429	33 108	53 536	0.69
Age group	Male	Female	Total	Percent
0–14	1 495 583	1 486 336	2 981 919	38.25
15–64	2 186 454	2 335 274	4 521 728	58.00
65+	123 646	168 847	292 493	3.75

View source data.
View source data.
View source data.
View source data.

== Vital statistics ==
Population, fertility rate and net reproduction rate, United Nations estimates

Registration of vital events is in Togo not complete. The Population Departement of the United Nations prepared the following estimates. Population estimates account for under numeration in population census.

	Mid-year population	Live births	Deaths	Natural change	CBR (Note: CBR = crude birth rate (per 1000); CDR = crude death rate (per 1000); NC = natural change (per 1000); TFR = total fertility rate (number of children per woman); IMR = infant mortality rate per 1000 births)	CDR	NC	TFR	IMR	Life expectancy (years)
1950	1,399,000	66,000	35,000	31,000	47.2	24.8	22.4	6.51	157.9	40.92
1951	1,421,000	68,000	35,000	32,000	47.3	24.7	22.7	6.54	157.1	41.01
1952	1,445,000	69,000	35,000	33,000	47.4	24.5	22.9	6.55	156.3	41.17
1953	1,469,000	70,000	36,000	34,000	47.3	24.2	23.1	6.57	155.4	41.36
1954	1,494,000	71,000	36,000	35,000	47.2	24.0	23.2	6.57	154.5	41.45
1955	1,519,000	72,000	36,000	35,000	47.1	23.8	23.3	6.57	153.7	41.56
1956	1,544,000	73,000	36,000	37,000	47.1	23.5	23.6	6.59	152.7	41.80
1957	1,571,000	74,000	37,000	38,000	47.1	23.3	23.9	6.61	151.7	41.97
1958	1,597,000	75,000	37,000	39,000	47.1	23.0	24.1	6.63	150.6	42.16
1959	1,624,000	77,000	37,000	40,000	47.2	22.7	24.5	6.68	149.5	42.45
1960	1,651,000	78,000	37,000	41,000	47.2	22.4	24.8	6.72	148.3	42.69
1961	1,679,000	80,000	37,000	42,000	47.4	22.2	25.2	6.75	147.0	42.88
1962	1,707,000	82,000	38,000	44,000	47.6	22.0	25.7	6.80	145.7	43.15
1963	1,737,000	83,000	38,000	46,000	47.9	21.7	26.1	6.85	144.3	43.37
1964	1,773,000	85,000	38,000	47,000	47.9	21.4	26.4	6.87	142.8	43.70
1965	1,820,000	87,000	39,000	49,000	47.9	21.2	26.8	6.90	141.2	43.97
1966	1,882,000	90,000	39,000	51,000	48.0	20.8	27.2	6.94	139.4	44.37
1967	1,957,000	93,000	40,000	53,000	47.9	20.4	27.5	6.96	137.5	44.82
1968	2,039,000	97,000	41,000	56,000	47.8	20.0	27.8	6.98	135.6	45.28
1969	2,120,000	101,000	42,000	60,000	48.0	19.7	28.3	7.04	133.5	45.67
1970	2,197,000	105,000	42,000	63,000	47.9	19.3	28.6	7.07	131.3	46.12
1971	2,267,000	109,000	43,000	66,000	47.9	18.9	29.0	7.10	129.1	46.59
1972	2,331,000	112,000	43,000	69,000	47.9	18.5	29.3	7.12	126.8	47.09
1973	2,391,000	115,000	43,000	71,000	47.8	18.1	29.7	7.13	124.4	47.60
1974	2,450,000	117,000	44,000	74,000	47.7	17.7	30.0	7.15	122.1	48.10
1975	2,510,000	120,000	43,000	76,000	47.6	17.2	30.4	7.15	119.8	48.73
1976	2,570,000	123,000	43,000	79,000	47.5	16.8	30.7	7.14	117.4	49.33
1977	2,631,000	125,000	43,000	81,000	47.2	16.4	30.8	7.11	115.1	49.76
1978	2,693,000	127,000	43,000	83,000	46.9	16.1	30.8	7.06	112.8	50.23
1979	2,761,000	128,000	43,000	85,000	46.4	15.6	30.7	7.00	110.5	50.77
1980	2,838,000	130,000	43,000	87,000	45.9	15.3	30.7	6.94	108.4	51.23
1981	2,926,000	133,000	43,000	90,000	45.6	14.9	30.7	6.87	106.2	51.76
1982	3,023,000	136,000	44,000	92,000	45.1	14.5	30.6	6.77	104.2	52.26
1983	3,127,000	139,000	44,000	95,000	44.7	14.2	30.5	6.70	102.3	52.64
1984	3,232,000	143,000	45,000	98,000	44.3	13.8	30.5	6.62	100.4	53.09
1985	3,337,000	146,000	45,000	101,000	43.8	13.5	30.3	6.54	98.7	53.43
1986	3,439,000	150,000	46,000	104,000	43.5	13.3	30.2	6.46	97.1	53.71
1987	3,545,000	153,000	46,000	107,000	43.2	13.1	30.1	6.39	95.7	54.05
1988	3,653,000	156,000	47,000	109,000	42.8	12.9	29.9	6.30	94.4	54.35
1989	3,764,000	159,000	48,000	111,000	42.3	12.8	29.5	6.22	93.2	54.39
1990	3,876,000	163,000	49,000	113,000	41.9	12.7	29.2	6.13	92.1	54.37
1991	3,990,000	166,000	51,000	115,000	41.6	12.7	28.9	6.05	91.1	54.27
1992	4,106,000	169,000	52,000	117,000	41.1	12.6	28.5	5.95	90.0	54.30
1993	4,078,000	172,000	53,000	119,000	40.7	12.6	28.1	5.85	88.9	54.20
1994	4,093,000	163,000	51,000	112,000	40.3	12.6	27.7	5.75	87.7	54.04
1995	4,280,000	169,000	53,000	116,000	39.7	12.5	27.2	5.65	86.3	54.04
1996	4,446,000	174,000	55,000	119,000	39.3	12.4	26.8	5.54	84.7	54.10
1997	4,593,000	178,000	56,000	122,000	38.8	12.3	26.5	5.44	83.0	54.19
1998	4,728,000	183,000	58,000	125,000	38.8	12.3	26.6	5.38	81.4	54.20
1999	4,868,000	189,000	59,000	130,000	38.8	12.0	26.8	5.34	79.4	54.54
2000	5,008,000	194,000	60,000	134,000	38.7	11.9	26.8	5.27	77.5	54.74
2001	5,145,000	198,000	61,000	138,000	38.6	11.8	26.8	5.23	75.6	54.86
2002	5,282,000	203,000	61,000	142,000	38.4	11.5	26.9	5.19	73.6	55.31
2003	5,421,000	207,000	61,000	146,000	38.2	11.3	26.8	5.15	71.8	55.64
2004	5,565,000	210,000	63,000	147,000	37.7	11.3	26.4	5.08	69.9	55.57
2005	5,712,000	215,000	63,000	152,000	37.6	11.1	26.5	5.07	68.2	55.96
2006	5,874,000	221,000	64,000	156,000	37.6	10.9	26.7	5.08	66.5	56.22
2007	6,048,000	229,000	65,000	164,000	37.8	10.8	27.0	5.09	64.9	56.51
2008	6,222,000	233,000	66,000	167,000	37.6	10.7	26.9	5.05	63.3	56.70
2009	6,399,000	240,000	67,000	173,000	37.5	10.5	25.9	5.03	61.7	57.01
2010	6,572,000	246,000	68,000	178,000	37.4	10.3	27.0	5.01	60.2	57.30
2011	6,749,000	247,000	67,000	180,000	36.6	10.0	26.7	4.92	58.6	57.93
2012	6,927,000	248,000	68,000	180,000	35.8	9.9	26.0	4.81	57.0	58.07
2013	7,106,000	251,000	68,000	183,000	35.3	9.5	25.8	4.72	55.4	58.68
2014	7,288,000	254,000	69,000	185,000	34.8	9.4	25.4	4.66	53.9	58.85
2015	7,473,000	257,000	69,000	189,000	34.4	9.2	25.2	4.59	52.4	59.40
2016	7,661,000	261,000	70,000	192,000	34.1	9.1	25.0	4.56	51.0	59.55
2017	7,853,000	264,000	69,000	195,000	33.7	8.8	24.9	4.50	49.6	60.15
2018	8,047,000	267,000	71,000	197,000	33.2	8.8	24.4	4.44	48.2	60.24
2019	8,243,000	270,000	70,000	200,000	32.8	8.5	24.3	4.39	46.8	60.90
2020	8,566,000	281,000	73,000	209,000	32.5	8.4	24.1	4.39	45.1	61.1
2021	8,774,000	284,000	74,000	211,000	32.0	8.3	23.7	4.32	43.8	61.3
2022	8,983,000	287,000	72,000	215,000	31.5	7.9	23.7	4.25	42.6	62.3
2023	9,196,000	290,000	72,000	218,000	31.1	7.7	23.4	4.19	41.4	62.7

Source: UN DESA, World Population Prospects, 2022

=== Demographic and Health Surveys ===
Total Fertility Rate (TFR) (Wanted Fertility Rate) and Crude Birth Rate (CBR):

Year	Total		Urban		Rural	
Year	CBR	TFR	CBR	TFR	CBR	TFR
1998	35,5	5,2 (4,2)	27,7	3,2 (2,6)	38,6	6,3 (5,2)
2013	32,9	4,8 (4,1)	32,2	3,7 (3,1)	33,2	5,7 (4,9)
2017	31.6	4.4	28.9	3.3	33.1	5.2

Fertility data as of 2013-2014 and 2017 (DHS Program):

Region	Total fertility rate (2013/14)	Percentage of women age 15-49 currently pregnant	Mean number of children ever born to women age 40-49	Total fertility rate (2017)
Lomé	3.5	6.2	3.7	3.1
Maritime (except Lomé)	5.2	9.5	5.1	4.2
Plateaux	5.2	10.6	5.4	4.9
Centrale	5.1	7.2	5.7	5.3
Kara	5.3	9.7	6.1	5.1
Savanes	6.0	9.3	7.3	5.7

=== Life expectancy at birth ===
Period	Life expectancy in Years
1950–1955	35.30
1955–1960	▲38.66
1960–1965	▲41.89
1965–1970	▲45.02
1970–1975	▲48.07
1975–1980	▲50.93
1980–1985	▲53.58
1985–1990	▲55.41
1990–1995	▲55.78
1995–2000	▼53.71
2000–2005	▲53.88
2005–2010	▲55.80
2010–2015	▲59.07

== Language and ethnicity ==
Togo's population of 8.64 million million people (2021 est.) is composed of about 21 ethnic groups, the two biggest being Ewe in the South (about 21% of the population) and the Tèm in the Centre (Bafilo, Sokodé, Sotouboua (about 22% of the population); they also live in Ghana and Bénin in big numbers. Tèms have a lot ties with 2/3 of the country as they live in the center of Togo. They exercise diversely almost all occupations from farmers, motors mechanic to business people. Dagomba is the first most common language in the north, where other Gur languages such as Mossi and Gourma are also found.

The ethnic groups of the coastal region, particularly Ewe and Gen language (or Mina) (the two major African languages in the south), constitute the bulk of the civil servants, professionals, and merchants, due in part to the former colonial administrations which provided greater infrastructure development in the south. Most of the southern peoples use these two closely related languages, which are spoken in commercial sectors throughout Togo.

The Kabye live on marginal land and traditionally have emigrated south from their home area in the Kara region to seek employment. Their historical means of social advancement has been through the military and law enforcement forces, and they continue to dominate these services.

Other groups include the Akposso on the Central Plateau, the Ana people who are related to the Yoruba, and live in the center of the country, in the strip between Atakpame and Tchamba, the Bassar in the Centre-West, the Tchamba in the Centre-East and the Konkombas in the upper region of Bassar, the Lambas in the Kandé region, the Hausa, the Tamberma, the Losso and the Ouachi.

== Religion ==
Christian 42.3%, folk religion 36.9%, Muslim 14%, Hindu <1%, Buddhist <1%, Jewish <1%, other <1%, none 6.2% (2020 est.)
