= Niamtougou =

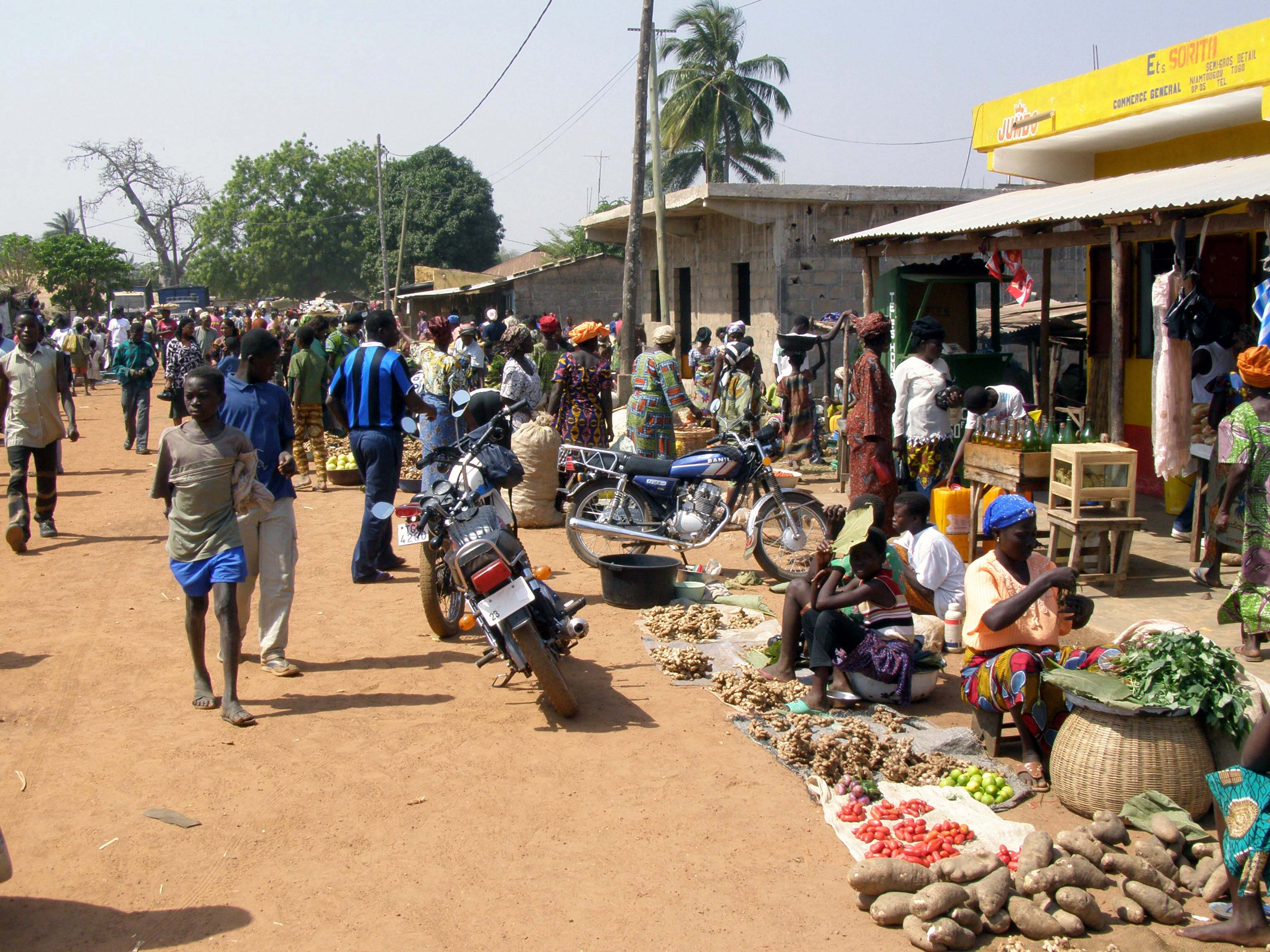

- Location in Togo
- Coordinates: 9°46′N 1°06′E
- Country: Togo
- Region: Kara Region

Population (2005)
  - Total: 24,000

Niamtougou is a market town in and district capital of Doufelgou District (Préfecture), in the Kara Region of Togo. It is located 28 km (17 mi) north of Kara on the nation's main north–south road, national road (Route Nationale). Niamtougou market is the one of largest in the region and is held every Sunday.

== Geography ==
Niamtougou is composed of six villages that are near each other: Niamtougou, Koka, Baga, Ténéga, Yaka, and Agbandé.

=== Climate ===
Climate data for Niamtougou (1991–2020)
Month	Jan	Feb	Mar	Apr	May	Jun	Jul	Aug	Sep	Oct	Nov	Dec	Year
Mean daily maximum °C (°F)	33.9 (93.0)	35.8 (96.4)	36.5 (97.7)	34.8 (94.6)	32.7 (90.9)	30.6 (87.1)	28.9 (84.0)	28.5 (83.3)	29.9 (85.8)	31.8 (89.2)	34.0 (93.2)	34.0 (93.2)	32.6 (90.7)
Daily mean °C (°F)	26.5 (79.7)	28.5 (83.3)	29.8 (85.6)	29.0 (84.2)	27.5 (81.5)	25.9 (78.6)	25.0 (77.0)	24.6 (76.3)	25.2 (77.4)	26.2 (79.2)	26.5 (79.7)	26.3 (79.3)	26.8 (80.2)
Mean daily minimum °C (°F)	19.1 (66.4)	21.4 (70.5)	23.2 (73.8)	23.3 (73.9)	22.4 (72.3)	21.4 (70.5)	21.1 (70.0)	20.8 (69.4)	20.6 (69.1)	20.7 (69.3)	19.1 (66.4)	18.6 (65.5)	21.0 (69.8)
Average precipitation mm (inches)	4.1 (0.16)	8.0 (0.31)	25.2 (0.99)	100.7 (3.96)	143.2 (5.64)	174.9 (6.89)	222.6 (8.76)	241.4 (9.50)	270.9 (10.67)	166.3 (6.55)	21.2 (0.83)	2.0 (0.08)	1,380.5 (54.35)
Average precipitation days (≥ 1.0 mm)	0.3	1.1	3.5	9.0	13.9	15.1	19.0	20.2	21.7	15.4	2.1	0.2	121.5
Source: NOAA

== Government ==
Niamtougou is the district capital of Doufelgou District and houses facilities of the Interior, Education, and Rural Development Ministries. The district's administrative offices, including the office and residence of the District Governor (Préfet), are located in Koka.

== Economy ==
Niamtougou Market is second only to Ketao Market in its importance in the Kara Region. While market day is weekly on Sunday, there is significant daily activity.

== Transportation ==
Niamtougou International Airport - Togo's second largest airport after the Tokoin International Airport in Lomé - is located in Baga, 4 km (2.5 mi) north of Niamtougou center. As of March 2021 it did not have regularly scheduled commercial flights. Niamtougou is on the nation's main north–south road, Route Nationale No. 1. Secondary roads leaving Niamtougou connect to the agricultural communities of Siou, Pouda, Massadéna, and Tchitchirra and the crossroads market town of Kouméa.

== Demographics ==
Niamtougou, Koka, Baga, and Ténéga are composed principally of speakers of Nawdm (Losso) while Yaka and Agbandé are composed of Lamba-speakers. Most of Niamtougou's Christian population is Roman Catholic. There is a mosque (masjid) in the center of Niamtougou across from the market. Most Muslims in Niamtougou are merchants or civil servants who are not originally from the area.

== Education ==
There are numerous public elementary schools and a secondary school (lycée). In addition, there is a Roman Catholic mission elementary school and a large Roman Catholic church. The largest Secondary school is "lycee Niamtougou".

== Health ==
There is a modest hospital and a small state hotel.

== Sports ==
Football is the most popular sport in town, which is home to Kakadlé FC. Its main football field has a capacity around 1,000.

== Gallery ==
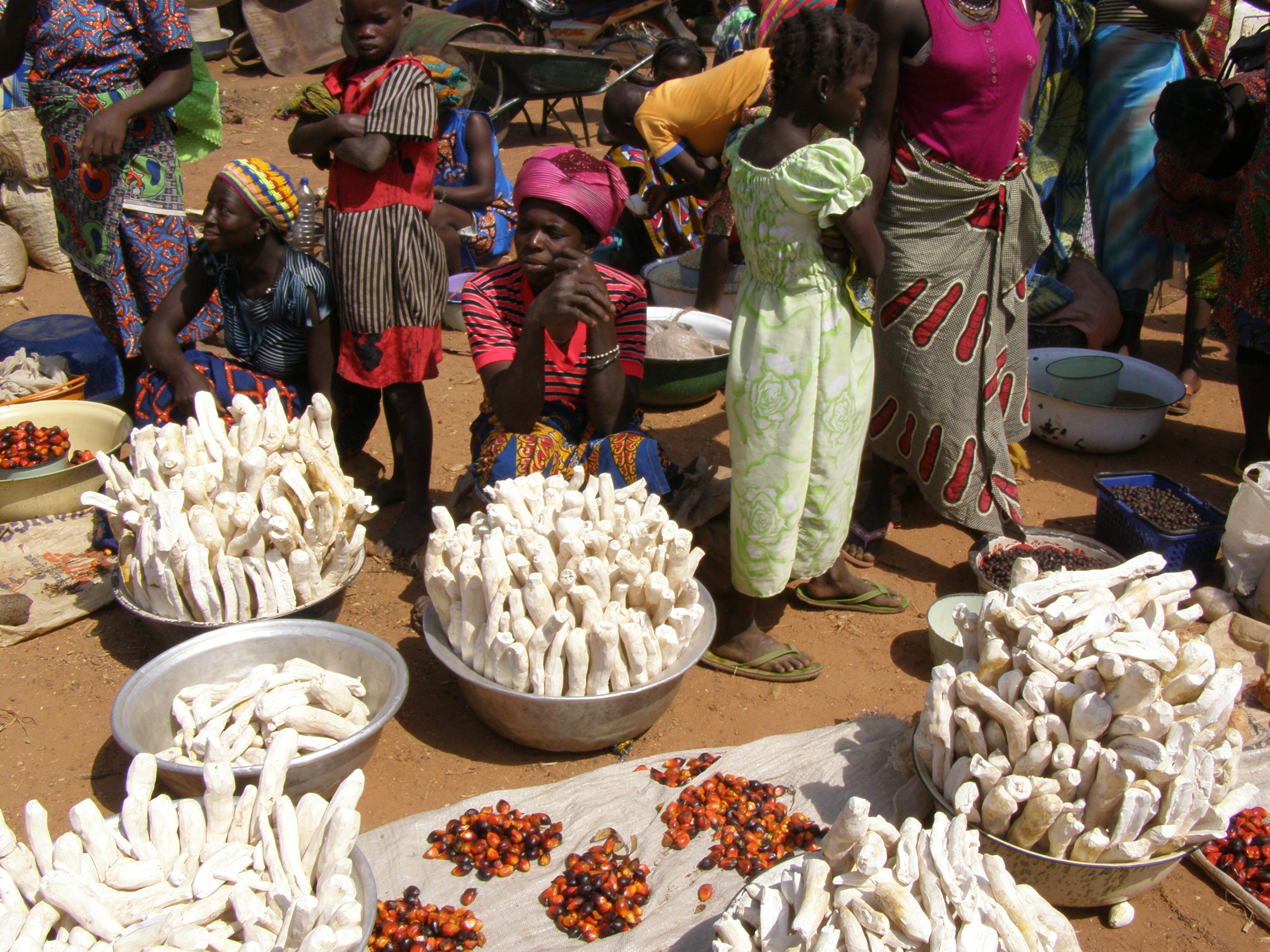
Niamtougou

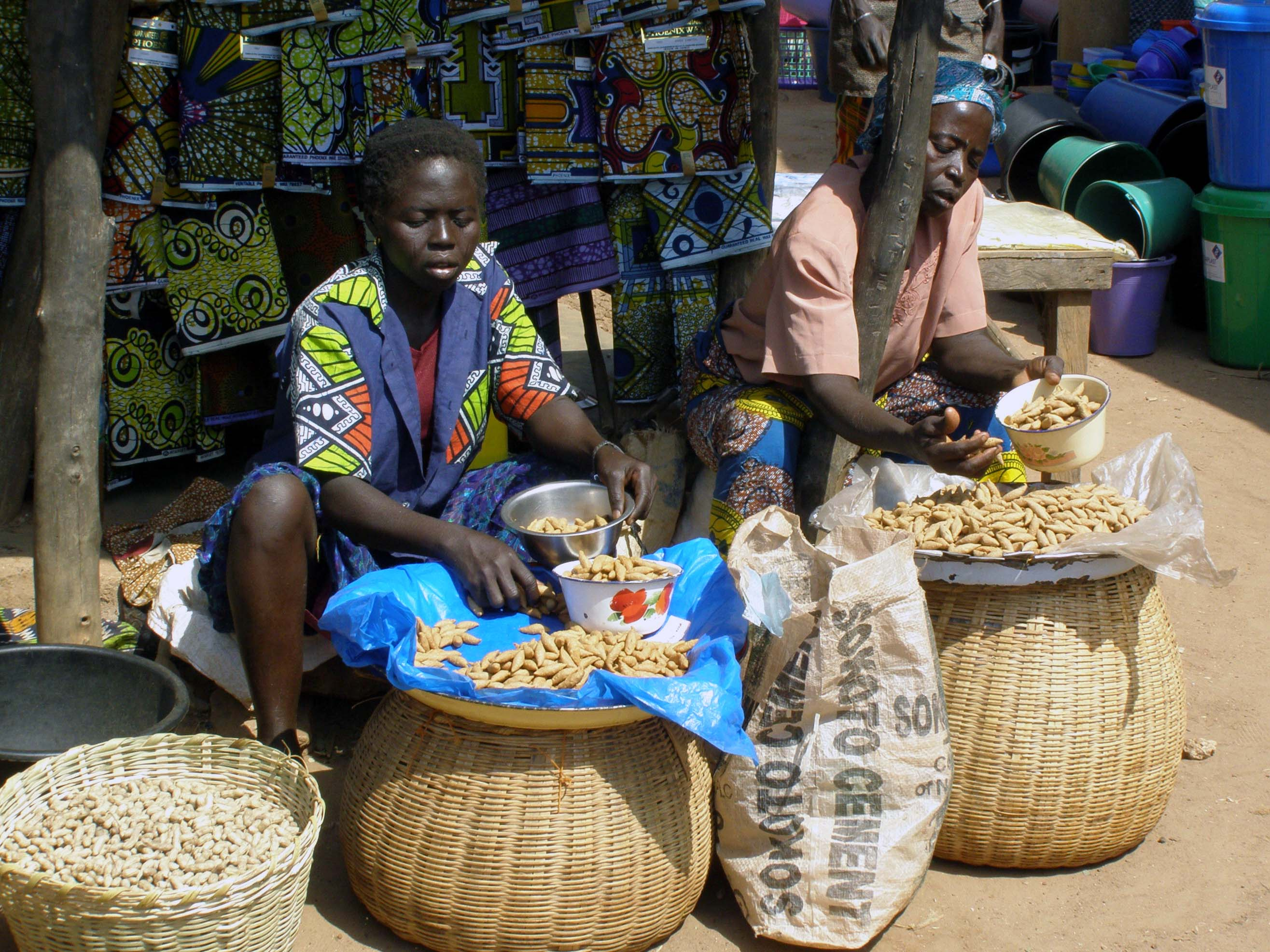
Niamtougou

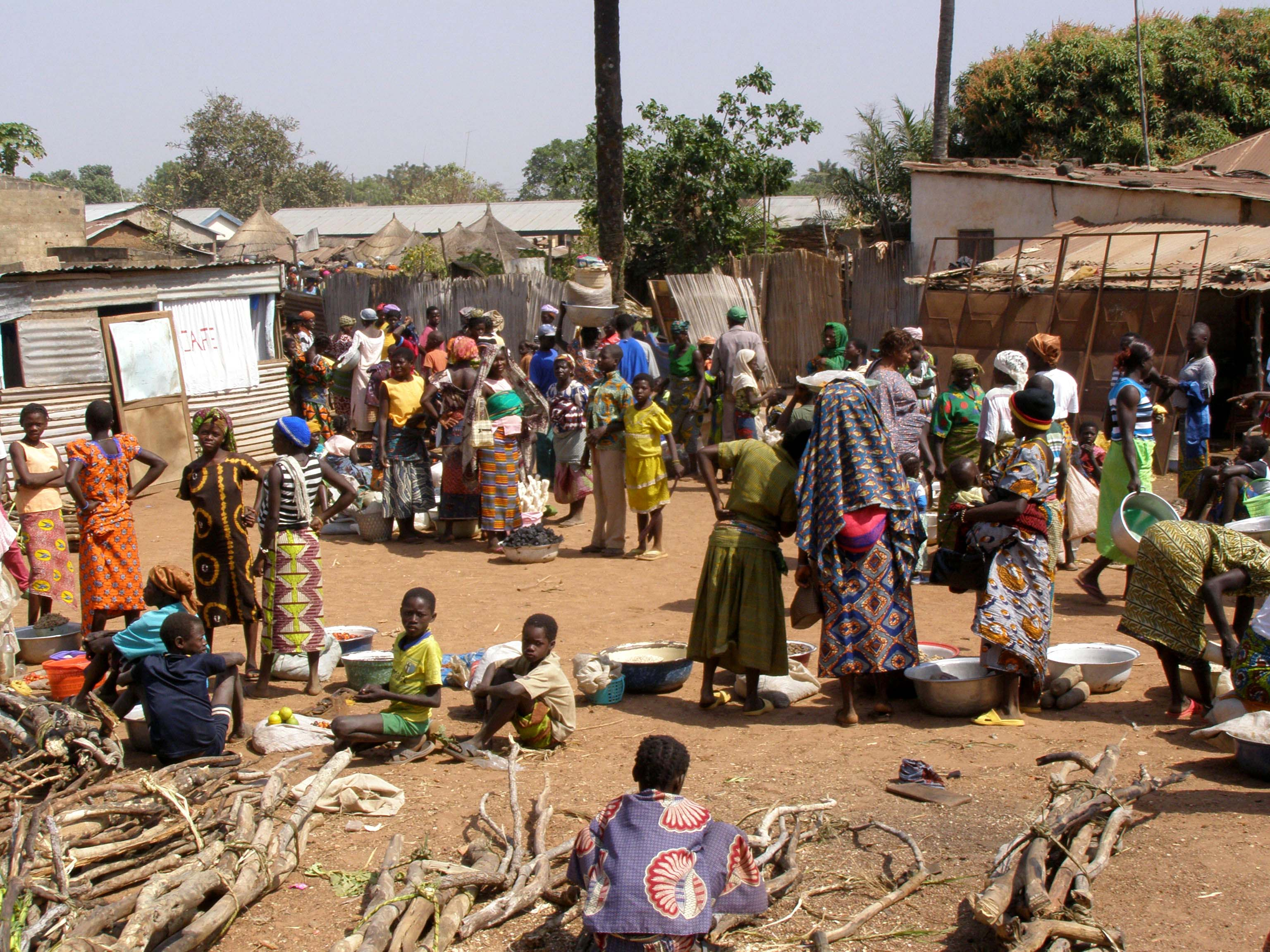
Niamtougou
