= Sokodé =

- City
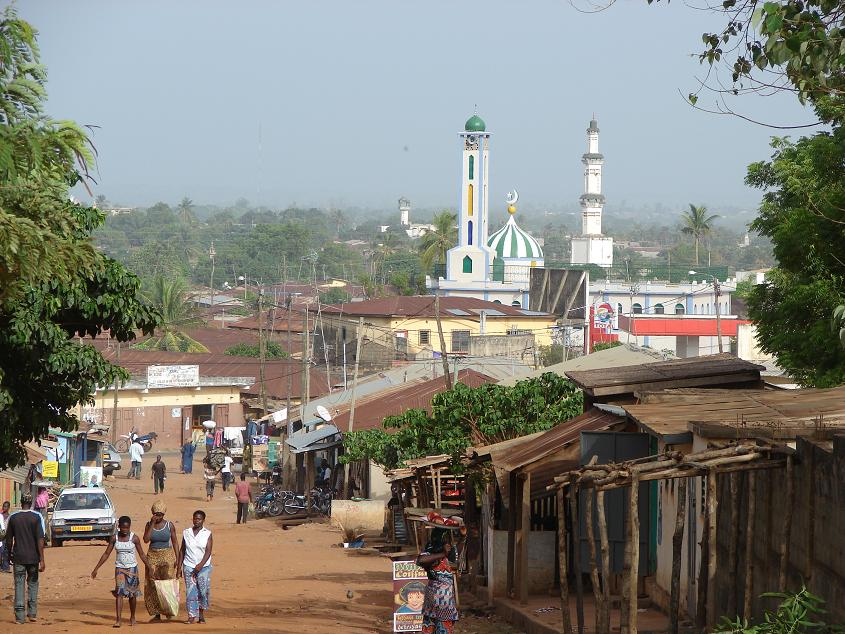
- Downtown Sokodé

- Location within Togo
- Coordinates: 8°59′N 1°08′E
- Country: Togo
- Region: Centrale Region
- Prefecture: Tchaoudjo
- Elevation: 340 m (1,120 ft)

Population (2015)
  - Total: 189,000
- Time zone: UTC±00:00 (GMT)

Sokodé is the second largest city in Togo, with a population of about 189,000. It is a commercial center for the surrounding agricultural areas, and seat of the Tchaoudjo Prefecture and Centrale Region. It is in the center of the country, 339 kilometres (211 mi) north of Lomé, between the Mo and Mono rivers. It is a multi-ethnic and multi-religious city, but is dominated by Islam. The ethnic majority are Kotokolis, who live alongside Muslims.

== History ==
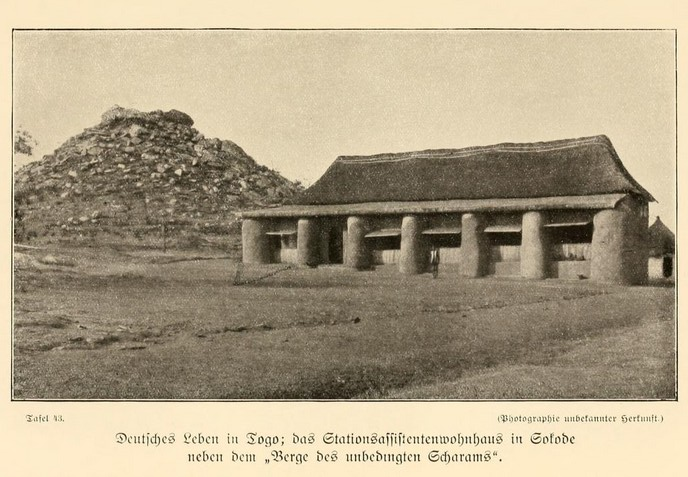
Sokode 1911

Ancient indigenous stock of the region mixed with more recent migrants of Gurma, from the eastern part of the Niger Bend, between Ouagadougou and Niamey, who brought the political system of chiefdoms with them. Added to this structure were Western Sudanic traders and craftsmen (the Mandinka, from historic Mali) and Hausa, a dynamic force since the 16th century. By choosing, in late 1897, to establish an outpost at Sokodé, Germans entrenched the role of the now dominant Kotokoli chiefdoms.

The city developed in precolonial times as a commercial crossroads on the Kola nut route between Ghana and Benin. Currently it is center on the only north-south road in Togo, linking the capital Lomé to Burkina Faso. Urbanization accelerated during colonization. The city consists of older villages that have now become neighborhoods.

Sokodé continues to be governed by a system balanced between a municipal administration and traditional chiefs. Historically, the chiefs of various villages were included in a leadership council, the Tchaoudjo.

== Geography ==
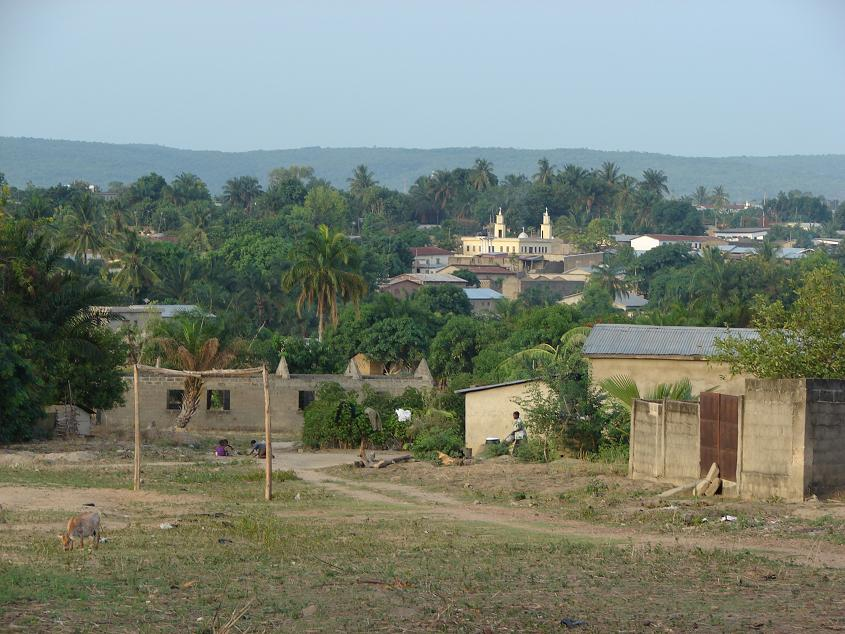
Kpangalam, a neighborhood of Sokodé

Sokodé's region is characterized by a dense network of rivers and hilly terrain. The two main rivers are the Kpondjo and Kpandi, which flow into the Na which in turn feeds the Mono River. The border between the Mono and the Volta River drainage basins is located a few kilometers north of the city. It is now in the catchment of the river Mô.

== Demographics ==
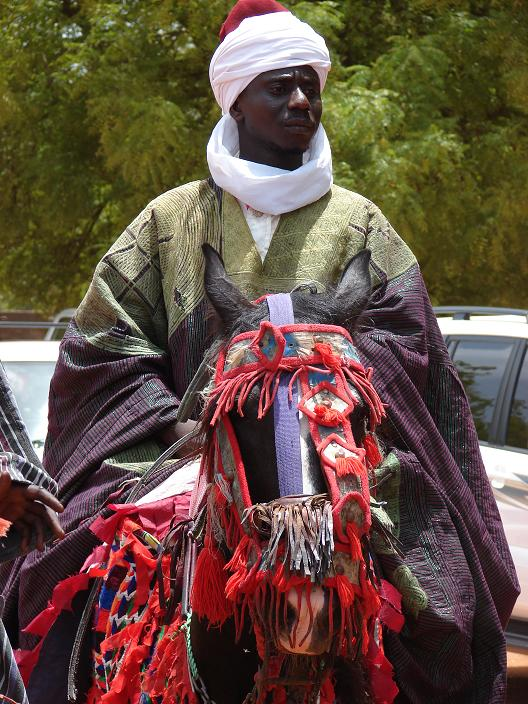
Horseman mimicking a Semassi warrior

Sokodé is the city with the highest proportion of Muslims in Togo. 70% of the population is Muslim and the remaining 30% are Christians, mostly Catholics. Sokodé is home to the Tem people and most people in Sokodé speak Kotokoli (or Tem). The ethnonym Kotokoli is the name that was given to these speakers by traders of the Niger Bend. Many other languages are spoken in Togo, especially Ewé, the dominant language of the south, and Kabyé, dominant language of the Kara region, further north. The Kotokoli and Kabyè languages are closely related.

From the standpoint of urban landscape, the city can be divided into two parts: the center, with high density traditional housing, and the suburbs, with housing becoming progressively less dense as one moves away from the center. Modern materials have been increasingly replacing traditional materials (mudbrick).

== Climate ==
Situated at an average altitude of 340 metres or 1,120 feet, midway between the ocean and the Sahel strip, Sokodé experiences a tropical savanna climate (Köppen Aw), with two distinct seasons: the rainy season, which lasts from April to October, peaking from July to September and the dry season from November to March. The rainfall is between 1,200 and 1,500 mm (47 and 59 in) per year and the number of rainy days varies between 100 and 130. The average temperature is 26 °C (79 °F) (1961–1990). The evaporation rate is high, estimated at 1,500 mm (59 in) / year, and is particularly marked in the harmattan period from November to January. The humidity is very variable, and depends on all the above factors.

Climate data for Sokodé (1991–2020, extremes 1901–present)
Month	Jan	Feb	Mar	Apr	May	Jun	Jul	Aug	Sep	Oct	Nov	Dec	Year
Record high °C (°F)	40.5 (104.9)	41.0 (105.8)	40.5 (104.9)	40.5 (104.9)	38.0 (100.4)	36.5 (97.7)	38.5 (101.3)	38.0 (100.4)	35.7 (96.3)	40.5 (104.9)	39.9 (103.8)	38.0 (100.4)	41.0 (105.8)
Mean daily maximum °C (°F)	34.8 (94.6)	36.3 (97.3)	36.5 (97.7)	34.7 (94.5)	33.0 (91.4)	31.1 (88.0)	29.6 (85.3)	29.0 (84.2)	30.2 (86.4)	32.2 (90.0)	34.5 (94.1)	34.4 (93.9)	33.0 (91.4)
Daily mean °C (°F)	27.0 (80.6)	28.8 (83.8)	29.8 (85.6)	29.0 (84.2)	27.8 (82.0)	26.5 (79.7)	25.6 (78.1)	25.3 (77.5)	25.8 (78.4)	26.3 (79.3)	26.9 (80.4)	26.5 (79.7)	27.1 (80.8)
Mean daily minimum °C (°F)	19.2 (66.6)	21.4 (70.5)	23.1 (73.6)	23.2 (73.8)	22.6 (72.7)	21.8 (71.2)	21.5 (70.7)	21.5 (70.7)	21.3 (70.3)	21.2 (70.2)	19.3 (66.7)	18.5 (65.3)	21.2 (70.2)
Record low °C (°F)	10.0 (50.0)	11.0 (51.8)	15.8 (60.4)	18.0 (64.4)	18.0 (64.4)	16.0 (60.8)	16.0 (60.8)	16.8 (62.2)	15.5 (59.9)	16.0 (60.8)	11.0 (51.8)	10.0 (50.0)	10.0 (50.0)
Average precipitation mm (inches)	4.3 (0.17)	13.0 (0.51)	38.8 (1.53)	101.6 (4.00)	119.4 (4.70)	149.0 (5.87)	219.5 (8.64)	258.3 (10.17)	249.5 (9.82)	111.3 (4.38)	13.3 (0.52)	0.9 (0.04)	1,278.9 (50.35)
Average precipitation days (≥ 1.0 mm)	0.4	1.1	4.6	8.7	11.9	13.9	18.8	21.4	19.9	11.3	1.4	0.3	113.7
Average relative humidity (%)	35	49	64	71	76	82	84	85	86	80	69	54	70
Mean monthly sunshine hours	262.9	243.1	235.0	214.7	220.2	174.8	124.7	110.4	135.5	213.9	250.6	256.0	2,441.8
Source 1: NOAA (sun 1961-1990)
Source 2: Deutscher Wetterdienst (humidity 1961-1990) Meteo Climat (record highs and lows)

== Economy ==
The economy of Sokodé is dominated by transport, trade and handicrafts. There is little industrial activity, like cotton ginning and sugar processing.

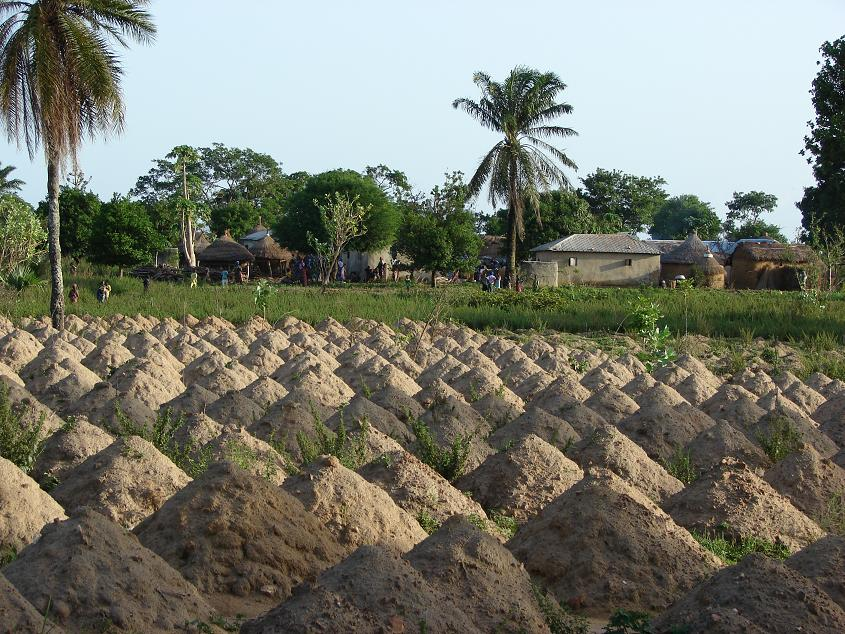
Sokodé

Farmers grow primarily corn, cassava, yams, pepper and beans, and many gardeners and farmers live on the periphery of Sokodé. They have herds of cows in the fields. Meanwhile, nomadic Fulani frequently pass near Sokodé, with their herds of zebu en route between Burkina Faso and Nigeria.

The vegetables are grown especially along the Kpondjo and Inusayo rivers. Most agricultural areas are floodplains, with growers beginning cultivation following the rainy season.

== Culture ==
=== Festivals ===
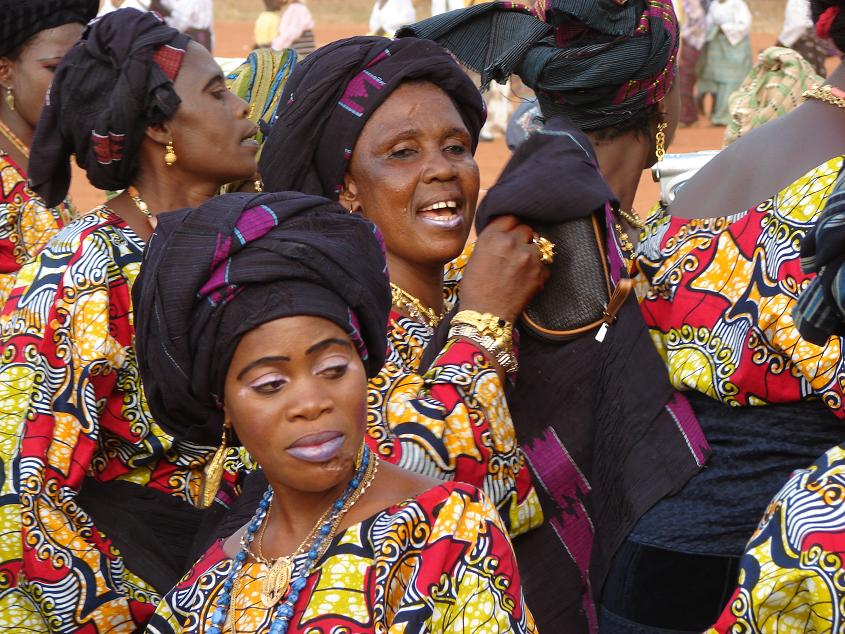
Dancers

'Gadao-Adossa-Kosso': the main Kotokoli festival consists of three days of festivities, from Friday to Sunday. Celebrated the evening before Adossa, Gadao's function is to thank the ancestors for abundant harvests. Adossa, or the Festival of Knives, is an initiation rite originating with Semassi warriors who demonstrate their strength and courage by undergoing physical challenges. The next day is Kosso, the Festival of Women, in which women dance in the Municipal Park in Sokodé City.

Among others, major festivals are held by different Sokodé clans. In most festivals traditional dancers are invited from the region, as well as riders mimicking the Semassi warriors, spinning at full speed in the middle of the crowd.

== Landmarks ==
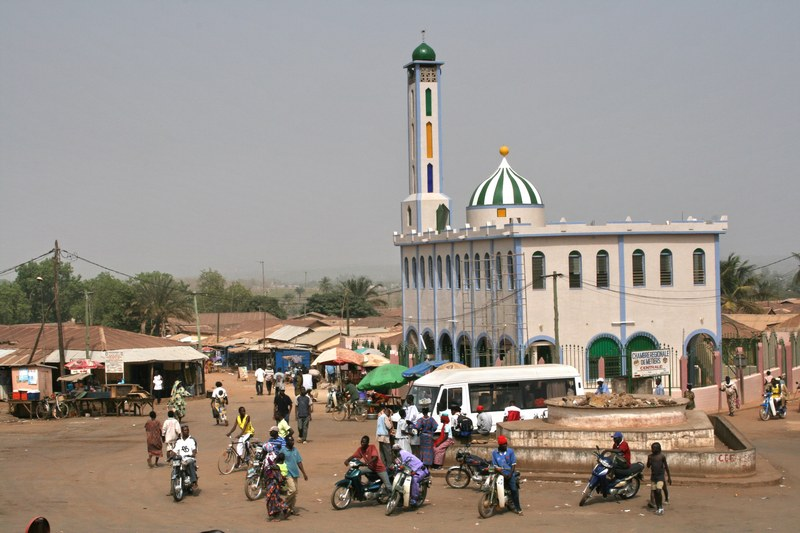
Mosque

Among the places of worship, they are predominantly Muslim mosques. There are also Christian churches and temples : Roman Catholic Diocese of Sokodé (Catholic Church), Evangelical Presbyterian Church of Togo (World Communion of Reformed Churches), Togo Baptist Convention (Baptist World Alliance), Living Faith Church Worldwide, Redeemed Christian Church of God, Assemblies of God.

A new market, the Sokodé Central Market, opened on January 16, 2025, with an inauguration attended by Togo’s President, Faure Essozimna Gnassingbé. It is a two-level modern commercial complex with 36 stores and 508 sales areas, funded by the Togolese government at a cost of 2 billion CFA francs (about $3.2 million), with support from KfW of Germany.

== Sport ==
The town is home to AC Semassi F.C. who play at the Stade Municipal as do the Tchaoudjo Athlétic Club.

== Notable people ==
- Kotokro - the founder of Sokodé.
- Zarifou Ayéva - politician
- Mohamed Kader - footballer
- Edem Kodjo - former Prime Minister of Togo
- Assimiou Touré - footballer
- Arissou Traorè - footballer

== See also ==
- Sokodé Airport
