= Agbeli Kaklo =

Ghanaian snack food

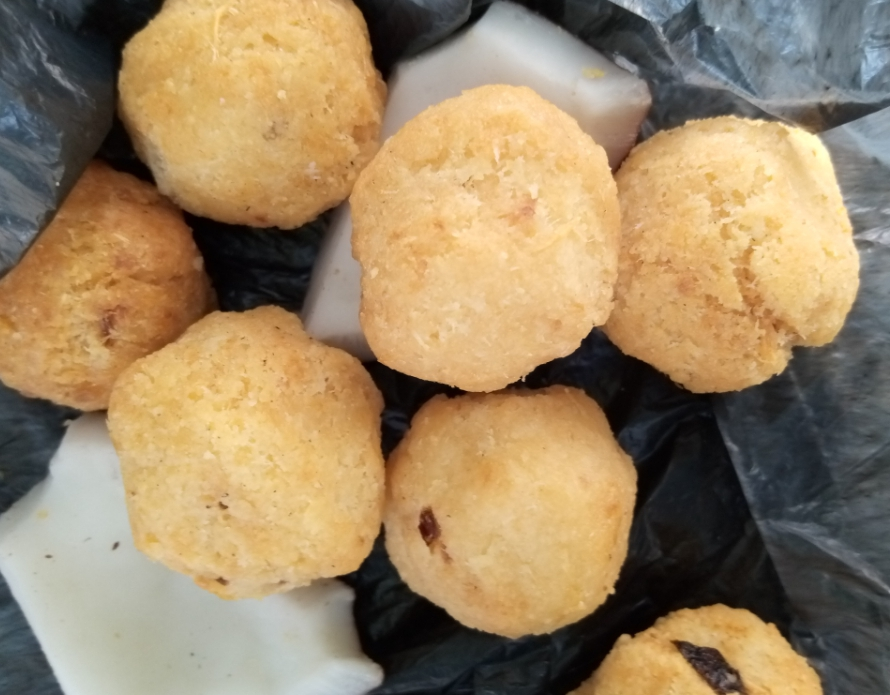
- Course: Snack
- Place of origin: Ghana
- Serving temperature: Hot/Cold
- Main ingredients: Cassava, Water, Onion, Oil, Coconut, Salt.

Agbeli Kaklo is a Ghanaian and Togolese snack made from cassava and eaten by the locals, the snack originated from the southern part of the Volta Region. It is very crunchy and mostly eaten with hard coconut. The snack is named as such because it is derived from cassava.

== Ingredients ==
The ingredients used in preparation:

- Milled/Grated Cassava.
- Water.
- Onion.
- Oil.
- Coconut.
- Salt.

== Preparation ==
Agbeli Kaklo is made by peeling and grating cassava, then removing extra water from it. The cassava is mixed with onions, pepper, salt, and sometimes corn flour or spices. The mixture is shaped into small balls or flat cakes and fried in hot oil until crispy and golden brown.

The way Agbeli Kaklo is prepared can be different in various regions and homes. Some people add ginger, garlic, or local spices for more flavour, while others make it in a simple traditional way. Agbeli Kaklo is usually eaten as a snack or served with pepper sauce and fish.
