= Nawdm language =

African language

Nawdm
- Losso, Nawdm
- Native to: Togo, Ghana
- Ethnicity: Losso people
- Native speakers: 190,000 in Togo (2020 and 8,000 in Ghana.)
- Language family: Niger–Congo?: Atlantic–Congo; Gur; Northern; Oti–Volta; Yom–Nawdm; Nawdm

Language codes
- ISO 639-3: nmz
- Glottolog: nawd1238

Nawdm is a Gur language of Togo and Ghana. There are approximately 190,000 speakers in Togo and 8,000 in Ghana.

== Nawdm in Ghana ==
Nawdm is spoken in the Greater Accra Region and the Oti Region. It is known by several names including "Loso" (or "Losu"), and "Nawdm" (sometimes spelled "Naoudem" or "Nawdam"). The first of these terms is improper and ambiguous. It is given by other language groups to refer to the Lamba (those who do not speak Nawdm) and the Nawdba (those who speak Nawdm)

== Nawdm In Togo ==
It is spoken in the Doufelgou Prefecture which is located in the Kara Region. Region—more precisely in the cantons of Togo Niamtougou, Koka, Baga, Ténéga and Siou. Nawdm is also spoken in the villages of Bogawaré and Kawa-Bas in the canton of Pouda, and in the village of Koré-Nata in the canton of Massédéna, still in the prefecture of Doufelgou. Historically, the latter are the descendants of the village of Banaa, formerly located roughly equidistant from Koka, Ténéga and Siou-Kpadb, on the outskirts of what is now called SORAD (from Société de Refinancement et de Développement (Refinancing and Development Company)), from whence they were driven out by the people of Baga shortly before the arrival of the Germans. The immediate neighbors of the Nawdba in this prefecture are: in the North, the Lamba of Défalé; in the South, the Kabyè of Pya; to the east, the Kabyè of Massédéna and Péssaré; to the west, the Lamba of Agbandé and of Yaka.

According to the most recent classifications of Bendor-Samuel in 1989 and those of Heine and Nurse in 2004, Nawdm belongs to the Yom–Nawdm group of the Oti-Volta subfamily of the central Gur or Voltaic languages, the Gur family itself being a branch of the Niger–Congo languages. These classifications are based on the work of historical and comparative linguistics of Gabriel Manessy who demonstrated that Nawdm was not, as some had initially believed, a dialect of Mooré, but a language which, while certainly being related to Mooré, however, belongs to another linguistic sub-group.

The term Losso is a vague local designation, never employed by linguists, referring to both the Nawdm and Lamba people.

== Orthography ==
Nawdm alphabet
A	B	D	E	Ɛ	F	G	Gw	Gb	H	Ĥ	I	J	K	Kw	Kp	L	M	N	Ny	Ŋ	Ŋm	O	Ɔ	R	S	T	U	V	W	Y
a	b	d	e	ɛ	f	g	gw	gb	h	ɦ	i	j	k	kw	kp	l	m	n	ny	ŋ	ŋm	o	ɔ	r	s	t	u	v	w	y

To distinguish a sequence of two consonants and a consonant represented by two letters, the diaeresis is used on the first letters of the sequence of two consonants, for example: the sequence of consonants (g̈w, g̈b, n̈y, ŋ̈m).

The uppercase letter Ĥ corresponds to the lowercase letter ɦ (the usual correspondence is Ĥĥ and Ɦɦ). This transcribes the glottal stop.

The high tone is denoted by the acute accent and the low tone is denoted by the grave accent, although in usual writing, the tone is only written in pronouns.
