= Kawa River (Togo) =

River in Togo

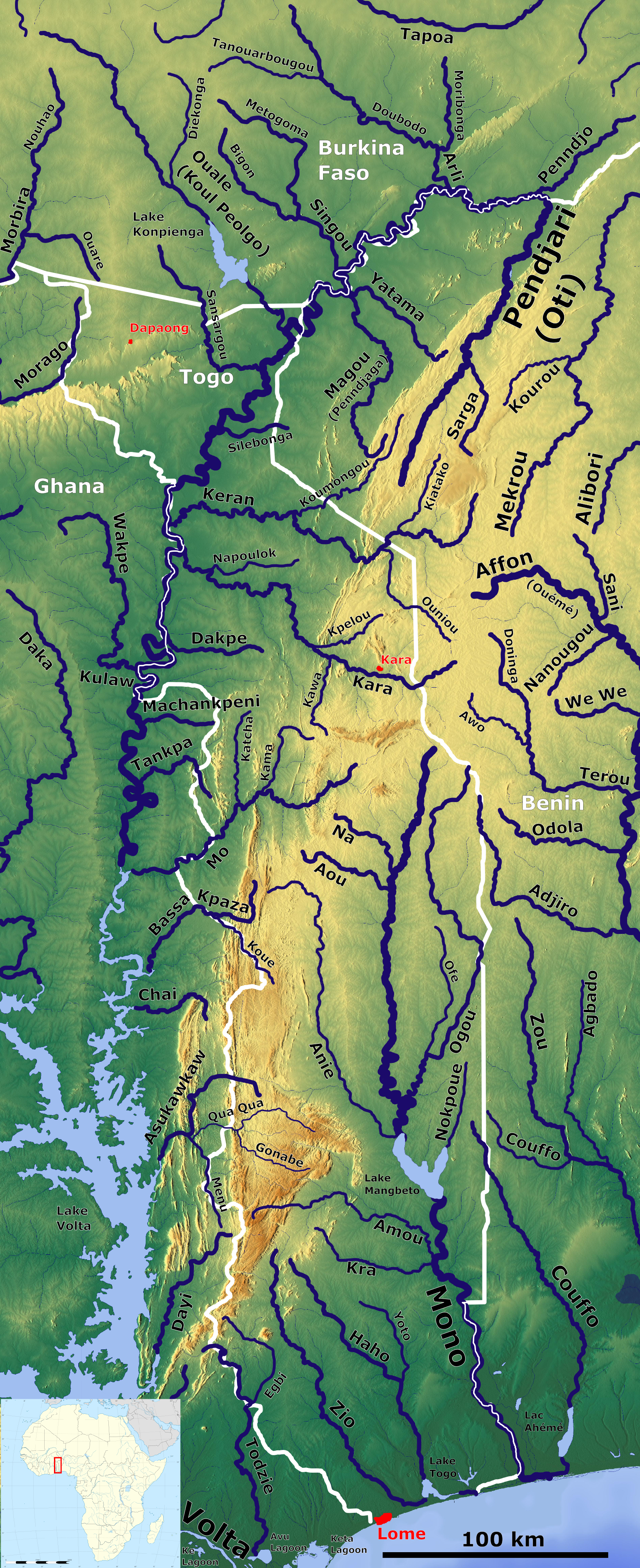
- Togo with the Kawa River flowing off the Kara River

Location
- Countries: Togo

Physical characteristics
- Source
  - elevation: 185 m (607 ft)
- Mouth: Kara River
  - coordinates: 9°38′58″N 0°55′19″W
- Length: 520 km (320 mi)
- Discharge
  - location: Mouth

The Kawa River is an intermittent river and tributary in the Kara Region of Togo. The river flows from the Kara River near Agbande and joins the Katassou River near Binako. The sands of the Kawa River have been recommended for catchment works although the river is without road access.
