= Sabirou Bassa-Djeri =

Togolese footballer (1987–2025)

Personal information
- Date of birth: 17 June 1987
- Place of birth: Sokodé, Togo
- Date of death: 14 June 2025 (aged 37)
- Height: 1.92 m (6 ft 4 in)
- Position: Goalkeeper

Senior career*
Years	Team	Apps	(Gls)
2007–2008	Dahana Sokodé		
2009–2010	Tchaoudjo AC		
2011–2013	AC Semassi		
2014	Gbikinti		
2014–2015	Béké		
2015–2017	Gbikinti		
2018–2020	Coton Sport		
2020–2025	Enyimba	38	(0)

International career
2017–2019	Togo	15	(0)
- * Club domestic league appearances and goals as of 1 August 2024

Sabirou Bassa-Djeri (17 June 1987 – 14 June 2025) was a Togolese professional footballer who played as a goalkeeper. He made 15 appearances for the Togo national team between 2017 and 2019.

== Career ==
Born in Sokodé, Bassa-Djeri played club football for Dahana Sokodé, Tchaoudjo AC, AC Semassi, Gbikinti, Béké and Coton Sport. In November 2020 he signed for Nigerian club Enyimba.

Bassa-Djeri helped win the 2018 Elite One in Cameroon as well as the 2022–23 Nigeria Professional Football League.

He made his international debut for Togo in 2017. He played in every one of Togo's matches in the 2019 Africa Cup of Nations qualification Group D.

== Death ==
Bassa-Djeri died on 14 June 2025, at the age of 37.
