= Tchaoudjo AC =

Togolese football club

- Full name: Tchaoudjo Athlétic Club
- Ground: Stade Municipal, Sokodé, Togo
- Capacity: 10,000
- League: Togolese Championnat National
- 2009: 12th
| Home colours | Away colours |

Tchaoudjo Athlétic Club is a Togolese football club based in Sokodé. They play in the top division in Togolese football. Their home stadium is Stade Municipal.

== Current squad ==
Note: Flags indicate national team as defined under FIFA eligibility rules; some limited exceptions apply. Players may hold more than one non-FIFA nationality.

| No. / Pos. / Nation / Player; 14 / MF / TOG / Nwuitcha Napo | No. / Pos. / Nation / Player; 17 / MF / TOG / Cyrill Guedje |

== International players ==
Below are the notable former players who have represented Tchaoudjo AC. To appear in the section below, a player must have represented his country's national team either while playing for Tchaoudjo AC or after departing the club.

- (Togo) Sabirou Bassa-Djeri
- (Togo) Djalilou Madjedje
- (Togo) Tawfik Moukaïla
- (Togo) Wassiou Ouro-Gneni
- (Togo) Aboudou Moutalébi Ouro-Wetchire
- (Togo) Arissou Traorè
