= Stade Municipal (Sokodé) =

Coordinates: 8°58′54″N 1°08′50″E

Stade Municipal is a multi-use stadium in Sokodé, Togo. It is currently used mostly for football matches and is the home stadium of AC Semassi F.C. and Tchaoudjo Athlétic Club. The stadium holds 10,000 people.
