= Lamba people =

Ethnic group in Benin and Togo

The Lambas are an ethnic and linguistic group of people living in the Kéran and Doufelgou Districts (Préfecture) of the Kara Region in Northern Togo and in the Atakora and Donga Departments of Bénin, West Africa. The capital of the Kéran District is Kanté, and the capital of the Doufelgou District is Niamtougou.

In Togo, the Lambas live in the Center and West of the Kéran District; in the Togo Mountains on the Défalé Chain; in the Western reaches of Doufelgou District; in Eastern reaches of Doufelgou District North of the Binah River; and, in Niamtougou, in the Villages of Yaka and Agbandé. In Bénin, the Lambas live in and around Boucoumbé (Boukamtié) in the Atakora Department and near Djougou and Bassila in the Donga Department. They also live in diaspora zones in the Central and Plateaux Regions of Togo, in border areas of Ghana, and in the capital cities of Lomé and Cotonou.

== People ==
The Lambas are primarily engaged in subsistence farming and small animal husbandry, especially chickens, guinea fowl, goats, pigs, and sheep. They grow millet and sorghum that they make into a thick porridge (la pâte) that is the staple of their diet and that they brew into thick low-alcohol beer. They also grow yams and cassava, groundnuts (peanuts), beans, and fonio.

The Lambas have migrated in search of fertile available land in Togo to the area along the North-South National Road No. 1 between Sokodé and Notsé, where they have founded numerous communities. In addition, they have migrated to Togo's capital city, Lomé, and the economic capital of Bénin, Cotonou, in search of wage employment. Lamba men served in the colonial armies of Germany, Britain, and France as well as in the Togolese and Beninese armies in the years following the independence of the two countries.

The Lambas refer to themselves and to their Language as Lama. Lamba is the name attributed to them in French and that continues to be used in the administration. In addition, all of the inhabitants of the Doufelgou District of Togo were designated as Lossos by the colonial administration, including people who identify themselves as Lama and Nawdba. Therefore, Lambas from the Doufelgou District are still frequently called Losso. The two populations have exercised considerable mutual influence but their languages are different and do not resemble each other.

== Language ==
The Lambas speak a collection of closely related dialects that are grouped together as the Lama language. There are approximately 200,000 native speakers of Lama in Togo and Bénin. Lama most closely resembles the Kabiyé language spoken by the Kabiyé people in the Kozah and Binah Districts of Togo as well as in diaspora points. Lama and Kabiyé are classified under the Grusi, Eastern cluster of the Gur branch of the Niger-Congo languages. Also included in this cluster are Tem (Cotokoli), Bagou-Koussountou, Lukpa (Logba or Dompago), Delo (Ntribou), and Chala. Speakers of this cluster of languages constitute 28% of the population of Togo and are the second most widely spoken cluster of languages in Togo after the Gbé cluster that includes Éwé, Mina, and Waci.
