= West Africa Baptist Advanced School of Theology =

College in Lomé, Togo

- Type: Private
- Established: 1971
- Affiliation: Togo Baptist Convention
- Location: Lomé, Togo
- Campus: Urban
- Website: esbtao.org

The West Africa Baptist Advanced School of Theology (French: École supérieure baptiste de théologie de l'Afrique de l'Ouest) is a Baptist theological institute, located in Lomé, Togo. It is affiliated with the Togo Baptist Convention.

== History ==
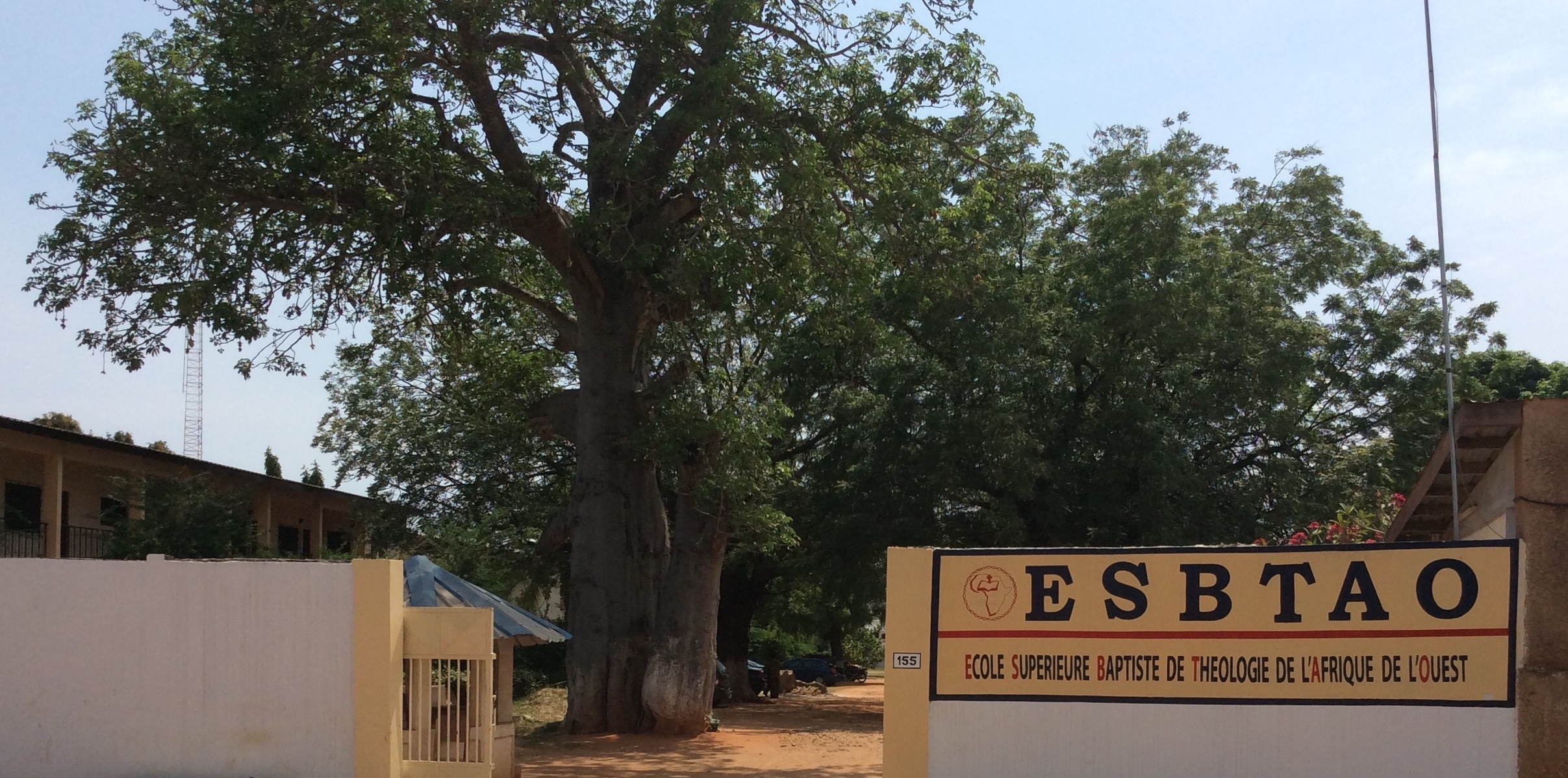
West Africa Baptist Advanced School of Theology in Lomé, in 2018.

The school was founded in 1971 as the Baptist Pastoral School by the Togo Baptist Convention and the International Mission Board, a Baptist Missionary Agency of the United States, to serve the French West African region.

In 1999, Bachelor of Theology programs is introduced. That same year, the school took its current name, West Africa Baptist School of Theology.

== Programs ==
The school offers programs in evangelical Christian theology, whose licentiates, masters.

== Partners ==
The school is a partner of the Francophone Baptist denominations of West Africa.
