= Kara, Togo =

Kara
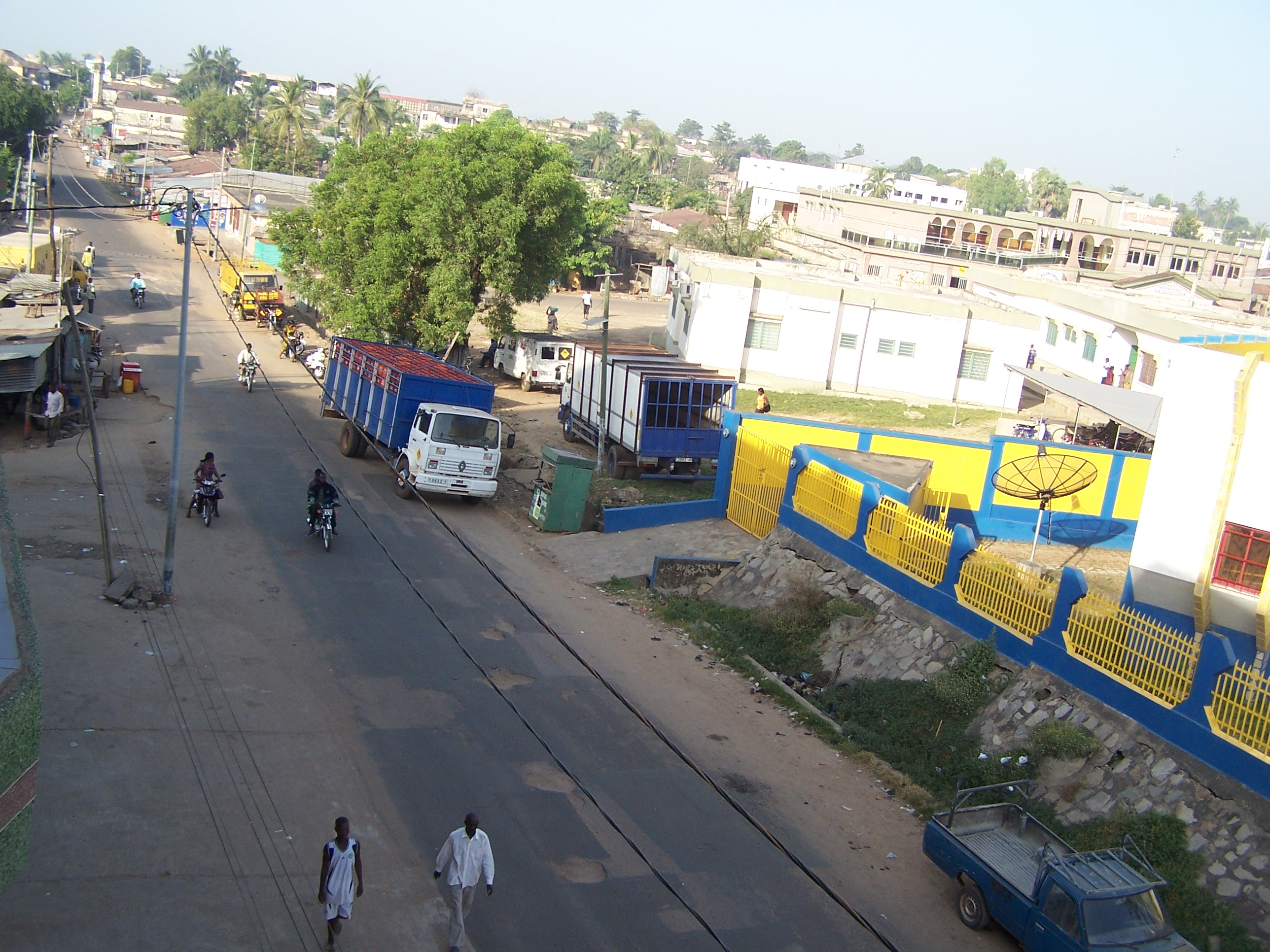

- Location in Togo and Haugeau River
- Coordinates: 9°32′56″N 1°11′26″E
- Country: Togo
- Region: Kara Region
- Elevation: 312 m (1,024 ft)

Population (2010)
  - Total: 94,878
- Time zone: UTC+0 (GMT)

Kara is a city in northern Togo, situated in Kara Region, 413 km north of the capital Lomé. Kara is the capital of the Kara Region and, according to the 2010 census, had a population of 94,878. The Kara River flows through the city and is its main resource of water. The city developed from the 1970s onwards from the village originally known as Lama-Kara. Its growth was largely due to the influence of the previous Togolese head of state Gnassingbé Eyadéma; he was born in the nearby village of Pya and understood Kara's strategic position at a crossroads of two trade routes.

== History ==
Kara used to be known as Lama-Kara.

In 1902, a bridge over the Kara River was built by the Germans, which marks the beginning of the city. Under the presidency of Gnassingbé Eyadéma, in the 1970s, the city developed particularly because of its role in holding political events.

== Geography ==
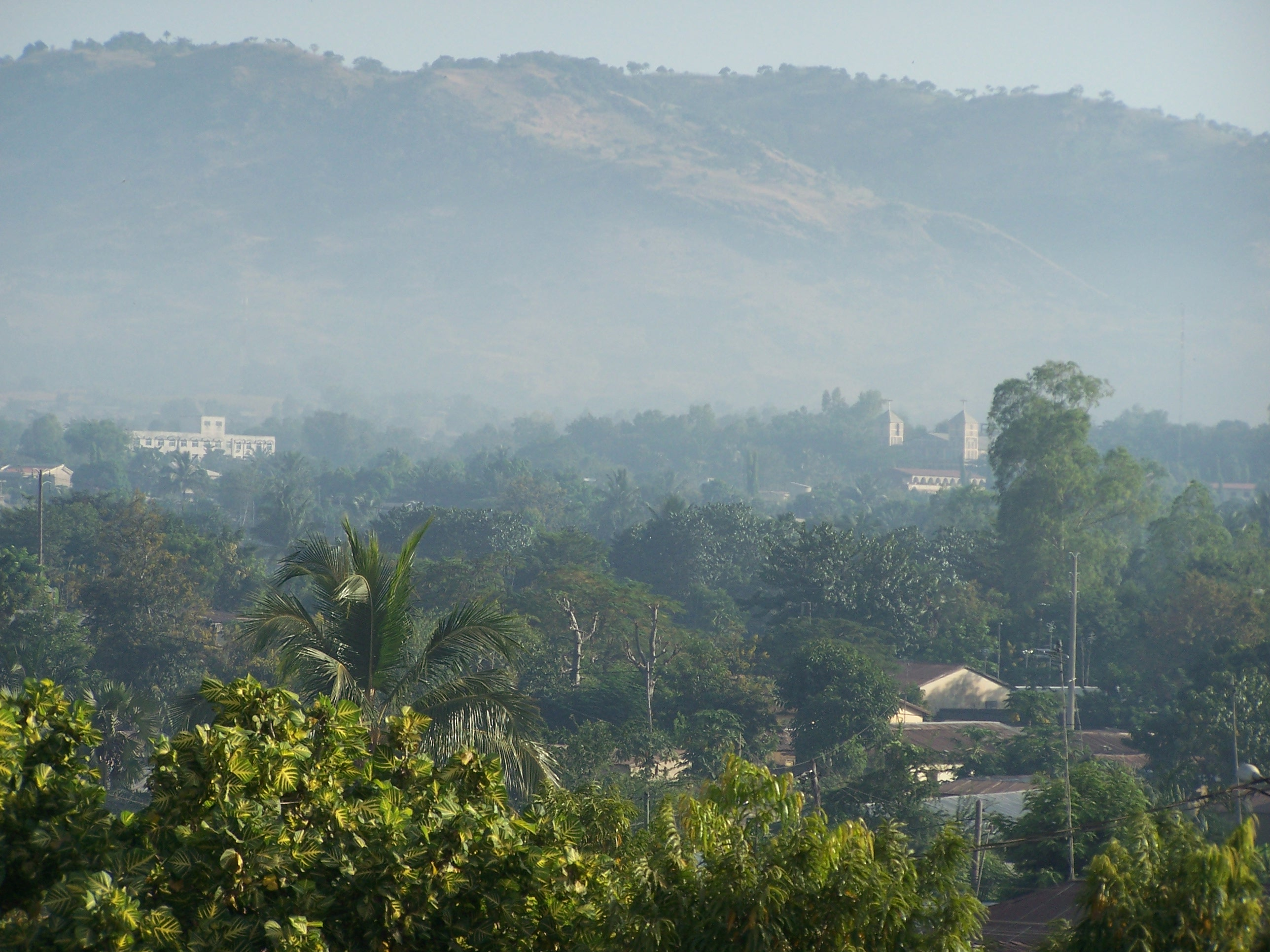
Kabiyè Mountains, Kara

The city lies at the southern tip of the southern Kabiye mountain range. Kara is at an altitude of about 400 meters. The Kara River runs through the center of the city.

The city lies on the crossroads of two trade routes, the main north-south road from Ouagadougou to Lomé, and the east-west road from Bassar to Djougou and Parakou in Benin.

=== Climate ===
Climate data for Kara (1991–2020)
Month	Jan	Feb	Mar	Apr	May	Jun	Jul	Aug	Sep	Oct	Nov	Dec	Year
Mean daily maximum °C (°F)	35.5 (95.9)	37.4 (99.3)	38.0 (100.4)	36.3 (97.3)	34.1 (93.4)	32.1 (89.8)	30.3 (86.5)	29.7 (85.5)	31.1 (88.0)	33.2 (91.8)	35.4 (95.7)	35.5 (95.9)	34.0 (93.2)
Daily mean °C (°F)	26.8 (80.2)	29.1 (84.4)	30.8 (87.4)	30.0 (86.0)	28.8 (83.8)	27.1 (80.8)	26.1 (79.0)	25.6 (78.1)	25.9 (78.6)	27.1 (80.8)	27.1 (80.8)	26.9 (80.4)	27.6 (81.7)
Mean daily minimum °C (°F)	18.7 (65.7)	21.4 (70.5)	23.6 (74.5)	24.1 (75.4)	23.5 (74.3)	22.0 (71.6)	21.8 (71.2)	21.5 (70.7)	21.1 (70.0)	21.1 (70.0)	18.9 (66.0)	18.3 (64.9)	21.3 (70.3)
Average precipitation mm (inches)	3.2 (0.13)	7.7 (0.30)	30.4 (1.20)	77.1 (3.04)	126.9 (5.00)	181.2 (7.13)	203.1 (8.00)	261.2 (10.28)	257.4 (10.13)	135.6 (5.34)	15.1 (0.59)	0.8 (0.03)	1,299.7 (51.17)
Average precipitation days (≥ 1.0 mm)	0.2	0.9	3.6	8.3	12.6	14.0	18.5	19.2	20.8	12.0	1.9	0.2	112.2
Source: NOAA

== Economy ==
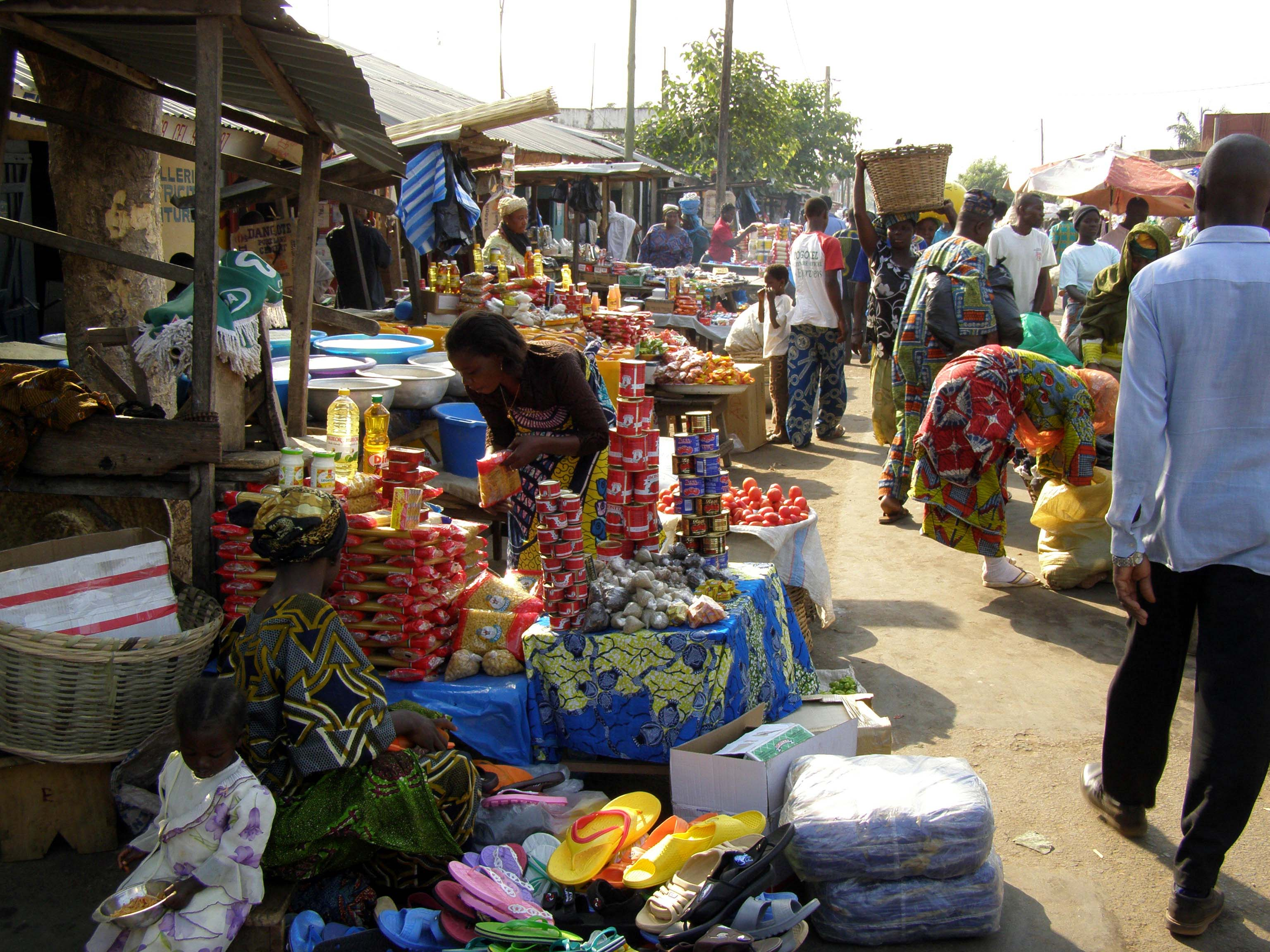
Kara Market

The majority of the population depend on subsistence agriculture cultivating maize, cassava, yams, sorghum, pearl millet, groundnuts, and as a cash crop, cotton. Small and medium-sized farms produce most of the food crop; the average farm size is one to three hectares.

== Transportation ==
The city is served various by several international bus lines to Lomé, Ouagadougou and Niamey, including Eltrab, LK, Adji, and Rakieta. Niamtougou International Airport, which is located 40 kilometers north of Kara, is undergoing development.

== Energy ==
The Compagnie d'Énergie Eléctrique du Togo reported in 2001 that Ghana supplied the city with 0.520 TWh of electricity.

== Education ==
In 1996, primary school enrollment rate was 81.3 percent. The education system has suffered from teacher shortages, poor educational quality in rural areas, and high repetition and dropout rates.

A second national university was created in Kara in 2004. The University of Kara is located at the southern edge of the city.

== Languages ==
Like most African cities, Kara is multi-lingual. In addition to French, the official language of Togo, the principal language is Kabiye, but it is also common to hear Tem, Zarma, Hausa, Yoruba and Igbo in the main market. Residents who have lived in the south of Togo are likely to have some knowledge of Ewe.

== Culture ==
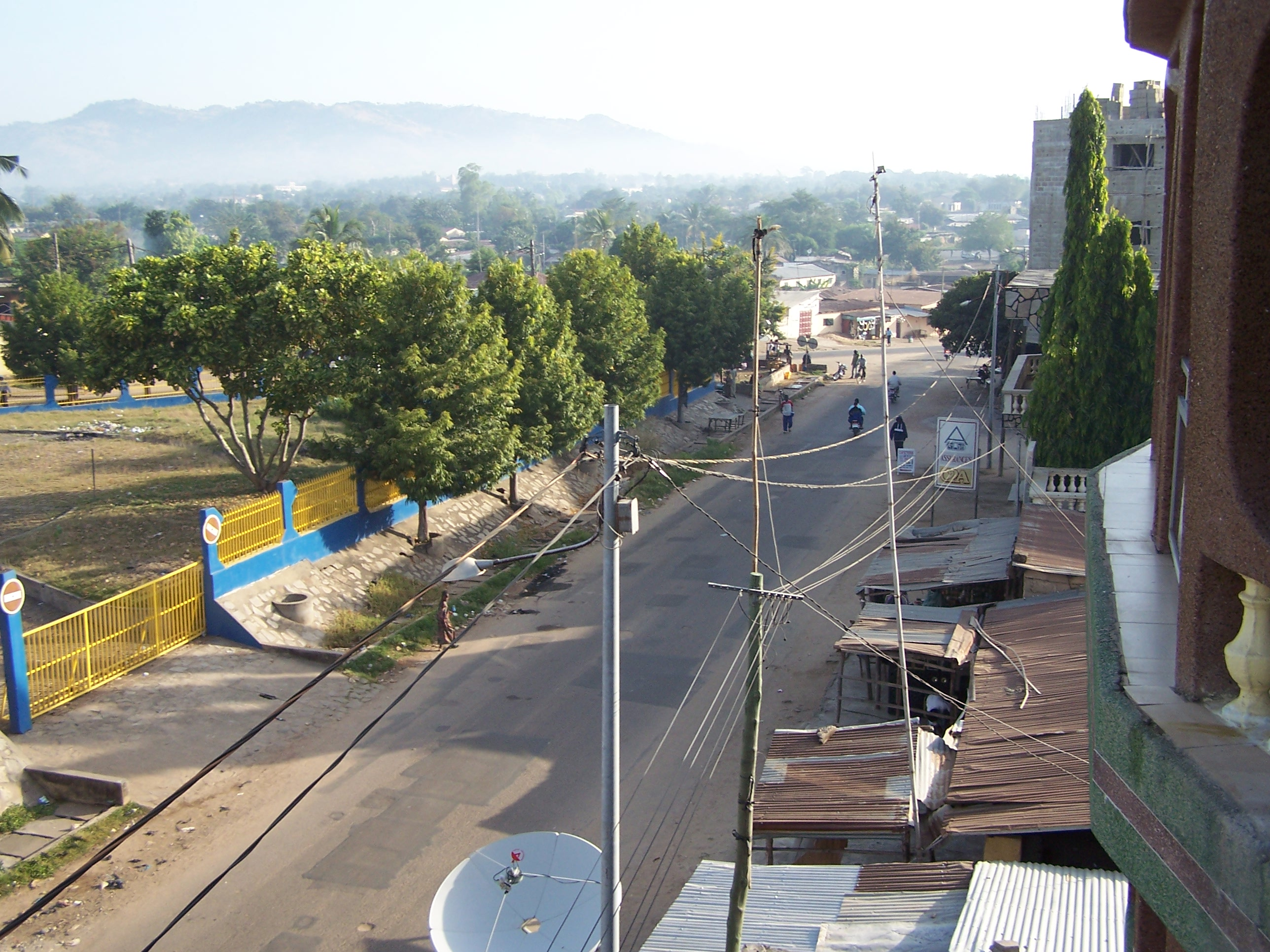
Kara, Togo - panoramio

Every July, a traditional wrestling tournament takes place in and around Kara. It is the first step in the Kabiye male initiation rite towards adulthood. The tournaments are organised by neighbourhood, by village and by canton. By tradition, the Head of State attends the finals.

== Architecture ==
The city has some buildings of architectural interest, such as the Congress Hall and the Cathedral of St Peter and St Paul. It also has numerous hotels, including Hôtel Kara, Hôtel de l'Union, Hôtel de la Concorde.

== Places of worship ==
Places of worship are predominantly Christian churches: Roman Catholic Diocese of Kara (Catholic Church), Evangelical Presbyterian Church of Togo (World Communion of Reformed Churches), Togo Baptist Convention (Baptist World Alliance), Living Faith Church Worldwide, Redeemed Christian Church of God, Assemblies of God. Many residents are Muslim, so there are also numerous mosques.

== Notable residents ==
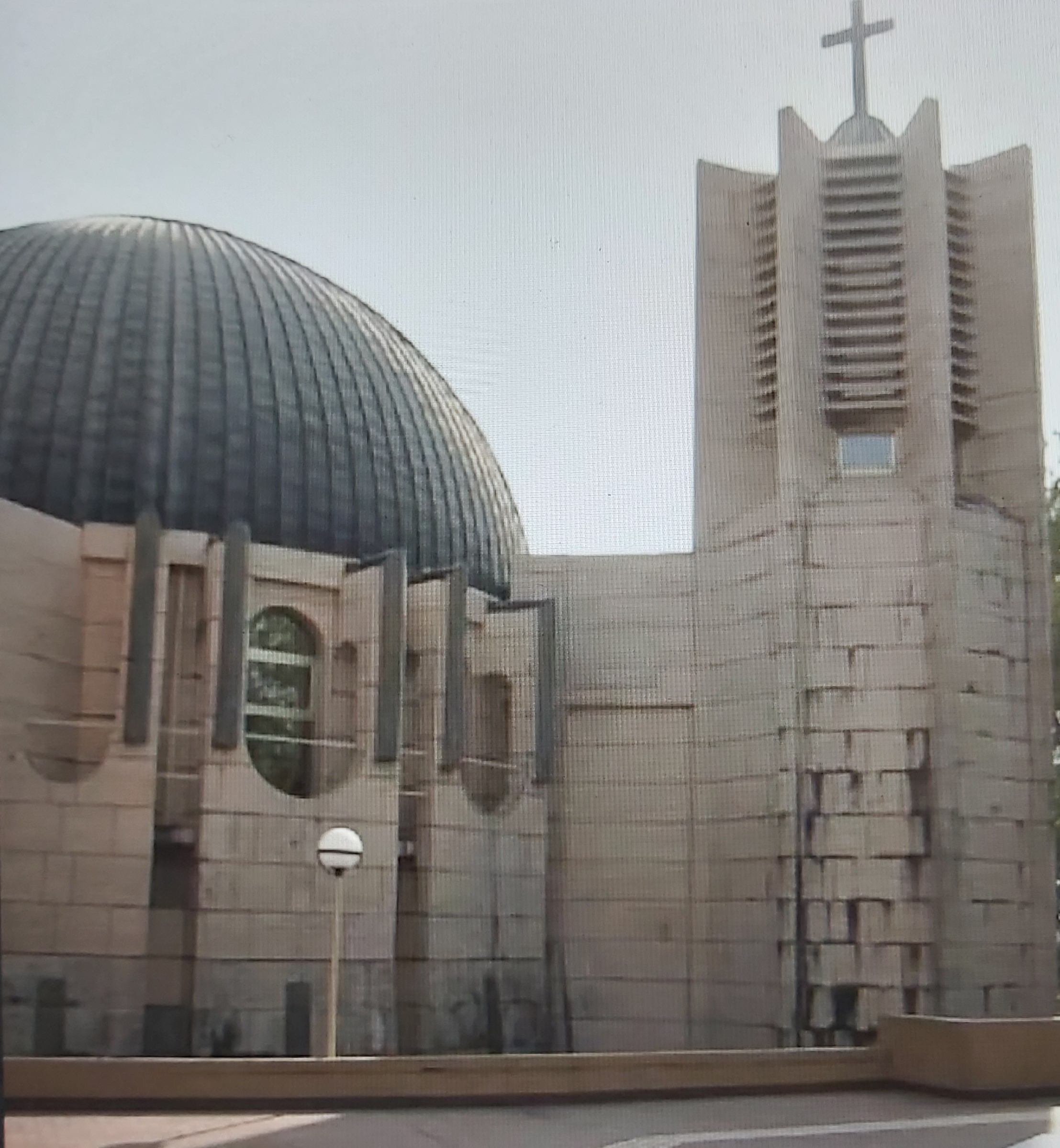
Mausoleum of Late President Gnassingbé Eyadéma in his former residence in Pya, Kara, Togo.

- Gnassingbé Eyadéma, the President of Togo from 1967 until his death in 2005.
