= University of Kara =

- l'Université de Kara
- Established: January 23, 2004; 22 years ago
- Affiliations: Association of African Universities; Agence universitaire de la Francophonie; Réseau pour l'excellence de l'enseignement supérieur en Afrique de l'Ouest
- Students: ca. 16000 (2016/17)
- Location: Kara, Togo; 9°31′50″N 1°12′30″E
- Website: www.univ-kara.tg

The University of Kara (abbreviated UK) is the second university in Togo after the University of Lomé. Located in the city of Kara, it was established by a presidential (Gnassingbé Eyadema) decree on 21 January 1999, and opened on 23 January 2004.

== History ==
The university opened on 23 January 2004 with ca. 1600 students. The Kara American Space was opened in the university's campus on 4 December 2012. The second largest centre of computing resources of the subregion, after that of the University of Ouagadougou in Burkina Faso, was created in 2013.
