= Niamtougou International Airport =

Airport in Kara, Togo

- IATA: LRL; ICAO: DXNG

Summary
- Airport type: Joint (Civil and Military)
- Serves: Niamtougou
- Location: Togo
- Elevation AMSL: 1,515 ft / 462 m
- Coordinates: 9°46′10.66″N 1°05′34.01″E

Map
- Location within Togo

Runways
Direction	Length		Surface
Direction	ft	m	Surface
03/21	8,202	2,500	Concrete
- Source:World Aero Data

Niamtougou International Airport (IATA: LRL, ICAO: DXNG) is an airport serving the north of Togo near Niamtougou. It is an international airport and Togo's second largest after Lomé-Tokoin Airport. The airport is located in Baga, 4 km (2.5 mi) north of Niamtougou.

== History ==
Opened in 1981, it has a 2500m runway, accessible to DC 10-30 planes and parking for 4 planes.

It is primarily used by the Togolese Air Force and by civilian government airplanes, and only occasionally by chartered and private flights. Attempts have been made to schedule regular commercial flights to serve northern Togo, such as Air Burkina Ouagadougou–Niamtougou–Lomé round-trip flights, but to date these have not proved to be commercially viable.

== Redevelopment ==
Redevelopment of the airport began in April 2016 to bring it up to ICAO standards. The project involves lengthening the runway by 500 meters and resurfacing it, incorporating a turning area, renovating the departure lounge, and building a perimeter wall. The project, which has a budget of 32,640 billion fcfa, is being jointly financed with a loan covering 85% of the budget from the China Exim Bank and the remaining 15% by the Togolese Government. The project is expected to take 12 months, and is being carried out by the China Airport Construction Group Corporation. The inauguration of the redeveloped airport is scheduled for 25 April 2017.

Also, thanks to its central location between other regional airports (Cotonou, Lomé, Accra, Abidjan, Ouagadougou, Niamey), Niamtougou International Airport has the potential for serving as a hub for several flight companies in the region.
