= Sokodé Airport =

Airport in Centrale, Togo

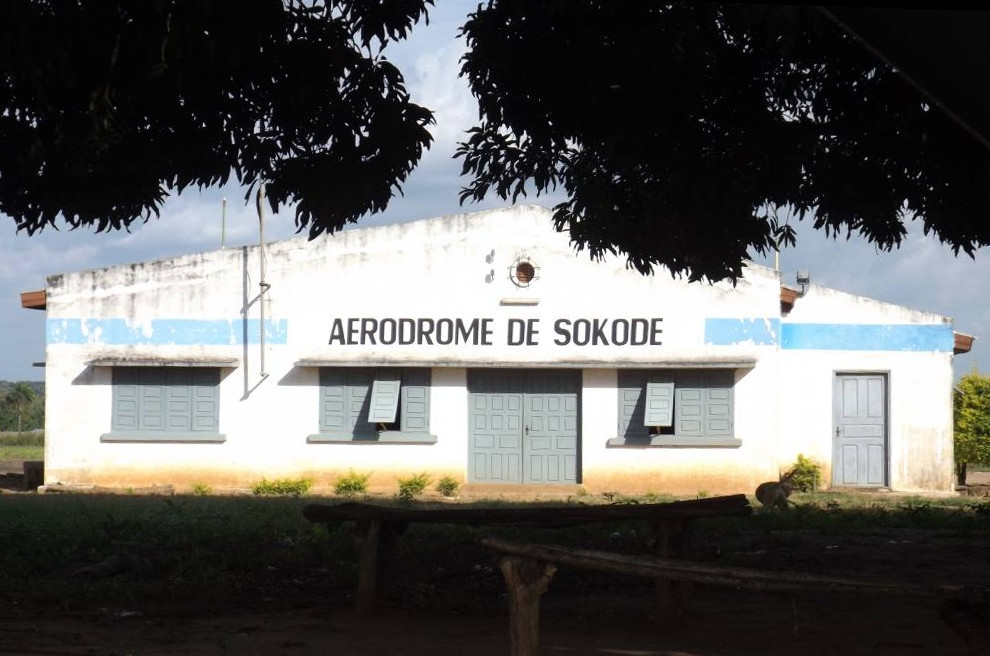
- IATA: none; ICAO: DXSK

Summary
- Airport type: Public
- Serves: Sokodé
- Elevation AMSL: 1,257 ft (383 m)
- Coordinates: 8°59′40″N 1°09′10″E

Map
- Location within Togo

Runways
Direction	Length		Surface
Direction	ft	m	Surface
03/21	3,280	1,000	Unpaved
- Source: Google Maps

Sokodé Airport (ICAO: DXSK) is an airport serving Sokodé in Togo.

== See also ==
- Transport in Togo
