= Baga, Togo =

- Location in Togo
- Coordinates: 9°23′N 0°51′E
- Country: Togo
- Region: Kara Region
- Prefecture: Doufelgou
- Time zone: UTC + 0

Baga, Togo is a canton of six villages in the Doufelgou Prefecture in the Kara Region of north-western Togo.
