= Kara River (Togo) =

River in Benin and Togo

Coordinates: 10.022°N 0.410°E

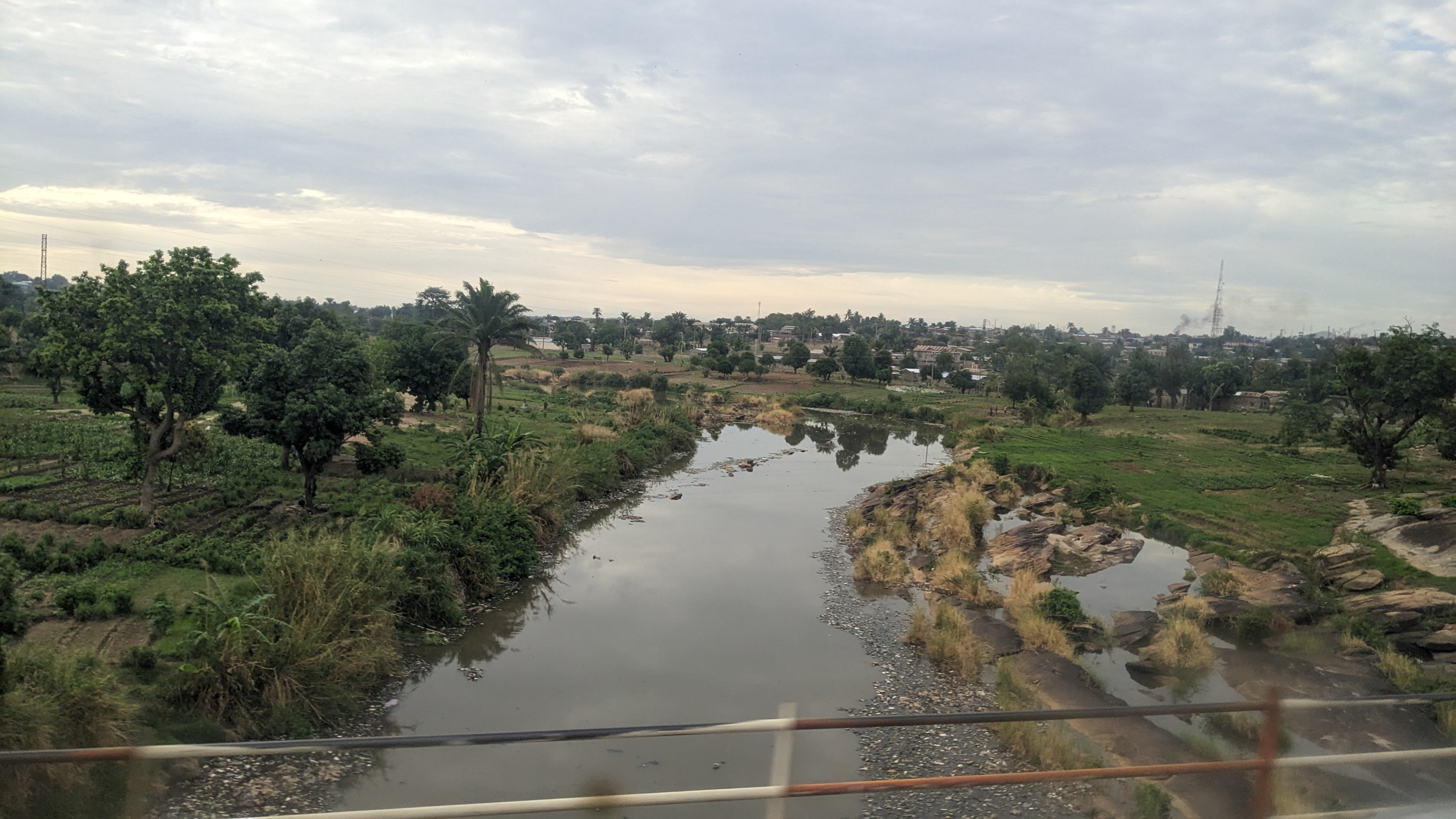
The Kara River flowing through the city of Kara.

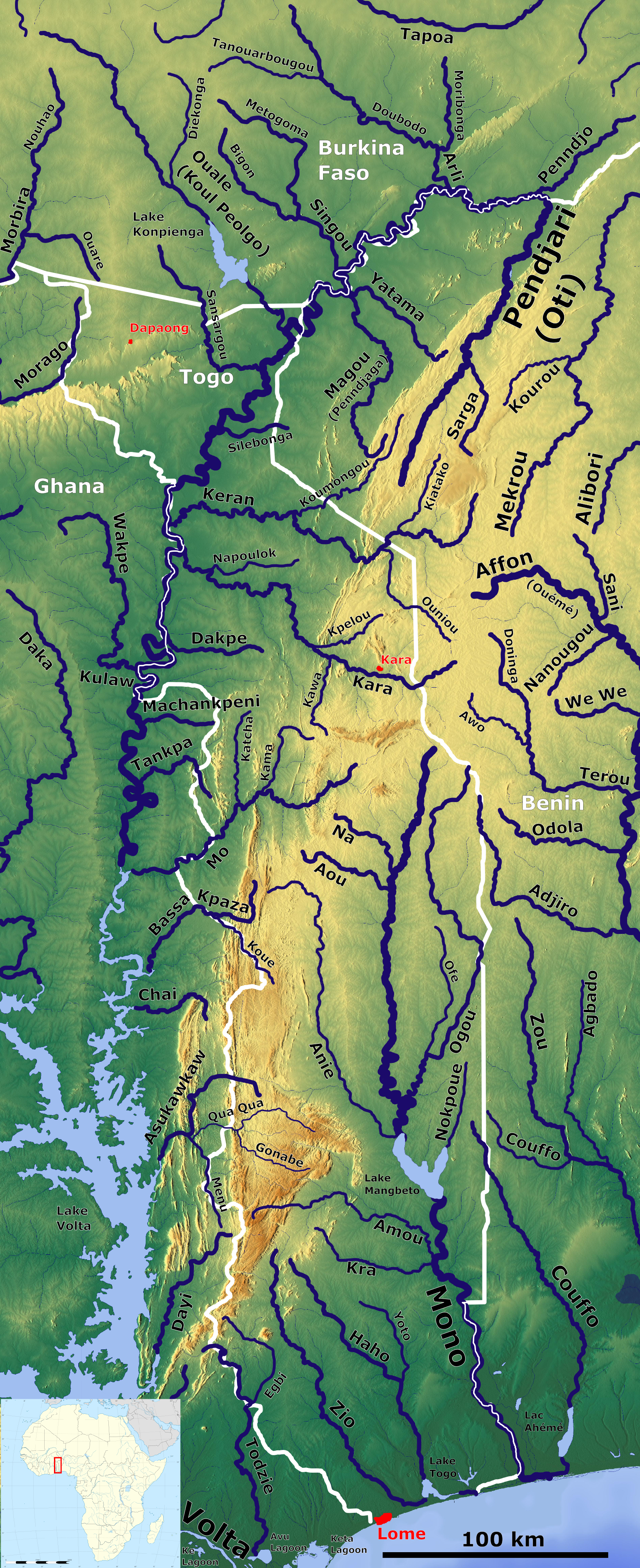
Course of the Kara in Togo (Center)

The Kara River is a river of northern Togo and Benin and a tributary of the Oti River. It rises in Benin's Donga Department and flows northwest through Kara Region in Togo, including through the town of Kara, emptying into the Oti River on the Togo-Ghana border. The Kara River Valley Agricultural Development Project is underway in the river valley, protecting about 300 square kilometres.
