= Amlamé =

Town in the Amou Prefecture of Togo

Coordinates: 7°28′N 0°54′E

Amlamé is a town in the Plateaux Region of Togo. It is located on the main highway between Atakpame and Kpalime (about 30 km from the former and 70 km from the latter). Administratively, it is the seat of the Amou Prefecture.

Amlamé is the Francization of the original Akposso name, Emla.

Ovazu is a traditional celebration of the town.
