= Galangachi =

- Location in Togo
- Coordinates: 10°30′11″N 0°21′21″E
- Country: Togo
- Region: Savanes Region
- Prefecture: Oti
- Canton: Galangashie
- Time zone: UTC + 0

Galangachi is a small town in the Savannah Region of Togo. In 2010, the town was the country's 22nd most populated settlement.
