= Arissou Traorè =

Togolese footballer

Arissou Traore
Personal information
- Date of birth: 31 December 1984 (age 41)
- Place of birth: Sokode, Togo
- Position: Forward

Team information
- Current team: ASD Chiampo

Senior career*
Years	Team	Apps	(Gls)
	Semassi	0	(0)
2010	Mussolente		
2011–2012	Recoaro Terme	20	(8)
2012–2013	Castelgomberto Lux		
2013–2014	La Contea Montorso Vicentino		
2014–2016	Castelgomberto Lux		
2016–2017	SSD Seraticense		
2017	AC San Vitale 1995		
2017–2018	Elettrosonor Gambellara		
2018–2021	Castelgomberto Lux		
2021–	ASD Chiampo		

International career^{‡}
2012	Togo	1	(0)
- * Club domestic league appearances and goals ‡ National team caps and goals as of 8 December 2013

Arissou Traorè (born 31 December 1984) is a Togolese semi-professional footballer who plays as a forward for ASD Chiampo.

Traorè made one FIFA unofficial appearance for the Togo national team.
