= Kpagouda =

- Location in Togo and Haugeau River
- Country: Togo
- Region: Kara Region

Kpagouda is a small town in the Kara Region of Togo. In 2010, the town was the country's 23rd most populated settlement.
