= Lama language =

Gur language of Togo and Benin

Lama
- Lamba
- Region: Togo, Benin
- Ethnicity: Lamba
- Native speakers: 260,000 (2006–2012)
- Language family: Niger–Congo?: Atlantic–Congo; Gur; Southern; Gurunsi; Eastern; Lama

Official status
- Recognised minority language in: Benin

Language codes
- ISO 639-3: las
- Glottolog: lama1275

Lama is a Gur language spoken by the Lamba people in Togo, Benin, and by a few in Ghana.

== Phonology ==
=== Consonants ===
	Labial	Alveolar	Retroflex	Palatal	Velar	Labial-velar	Glottal
Nasal	m	n		ɲ	ŋ		
Stop	p	t	ɖ	tʃ	k	k͡p	
Fricative	ɸ	s					h
Approximant		l		j		w	

=== Vowels ===
	Front			Central			Back		
	short	long	nasal	short	long	nasal	short	long	nasal
Close	i	iː	ĩ	ɨ	ɨː	ɨ̃	u	uː	ũ
Near-close	ɪ	ɪː	ɪ̃				ʊ	ʊː	ʊ̃
Close-mid	e	eː	ẽ	ə	əː	ə̃	o	oː	õ
Open-mid	ɛ	ɛː	ɛ̃	ə	əː	ə̃	ɔ	ɔː	ɔ̃
Open				a	aː	ã			

=== Tones ===
	Toneme
Falling	˦˨
Level	˨
Rising	˨˦

== Alphabet ==
Lama alphabet
Uppercase	A	C	D	Ɖ	E	Ǝ	Ɛ	F	H	I	Ɨ	Ɩ	K	KP	L
Lowercase	a	c	d	ɖ	e	ǝ	ɛ	f	h	i	ɨ	ɩ	k	kp	l
Uppercase	M	N	Ŋ	Ñ	O	Ɔ	P	R	S	T	U	Ʋ	W	Y	
Lowercase	m	n	ŋ	ñ	o	ɔ	p	r	s	t	u	ʋ	w	y	
