= Mo River =

River in Ghana and Togo

Mo River Rivière Mo

Location
- Countries: Ghana and Togo

Physical characteristics
- Mouth: Lake Volta of Ghana
  - location: Gulf of Guinea
  - coordinates: 8°45′00″N 00°11′00″E
- Discharge
  - location: Mouth

The Mo River (French: Rivière Mo) is a river of Ghana and Togo, and it arises in Togo and flows west, forming a short part of the international boundary between Ghana and Togo. It empties into Lake Volta in Ghana.
