= Togo Baptist Convention =

Baptist Christian denomination in Togo

- Convention baptiste du Togo
- Abbreviation: CBT
- Classification: Evangelical Christianity
- Theology: Baptist
- Associations: Baptist World Alliance
- Headquarters: Lomé, Togo
- Origin: 1964
- Congregations: 537
- Members: 25,403
- Seminaries: West Africa Baptist Advanced School of Theology
- Official website: conventionbaptistetogo.org

The Togo Baptist Convention (French: Convention baptiste du Togo) is a Baptist Christian denomination in Togo. It is affiliated with the Baptist World Alliance. The headquarters is in Lomé.

== History ==
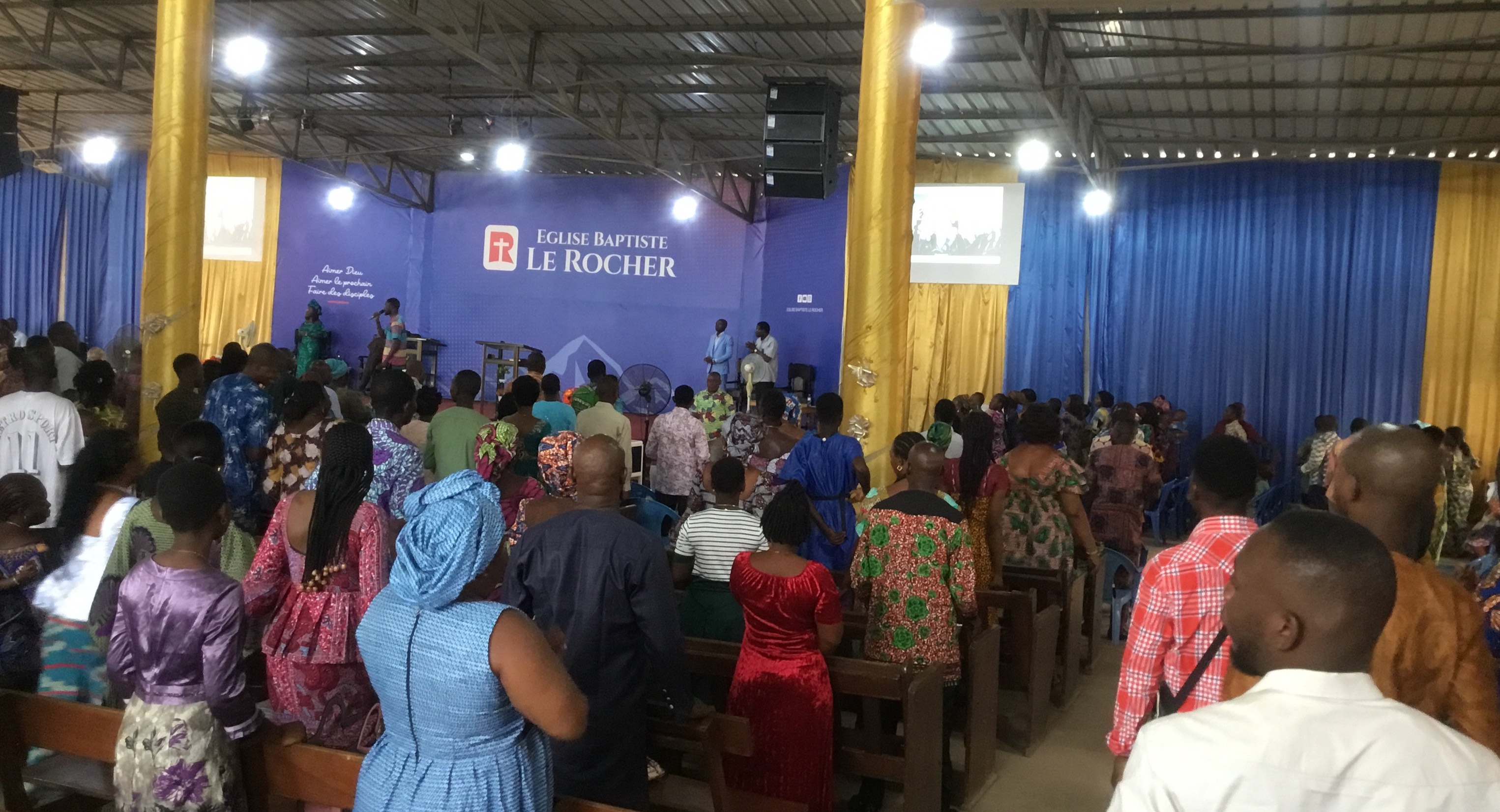
Worship service at The rock Baptist Church in Lomé.

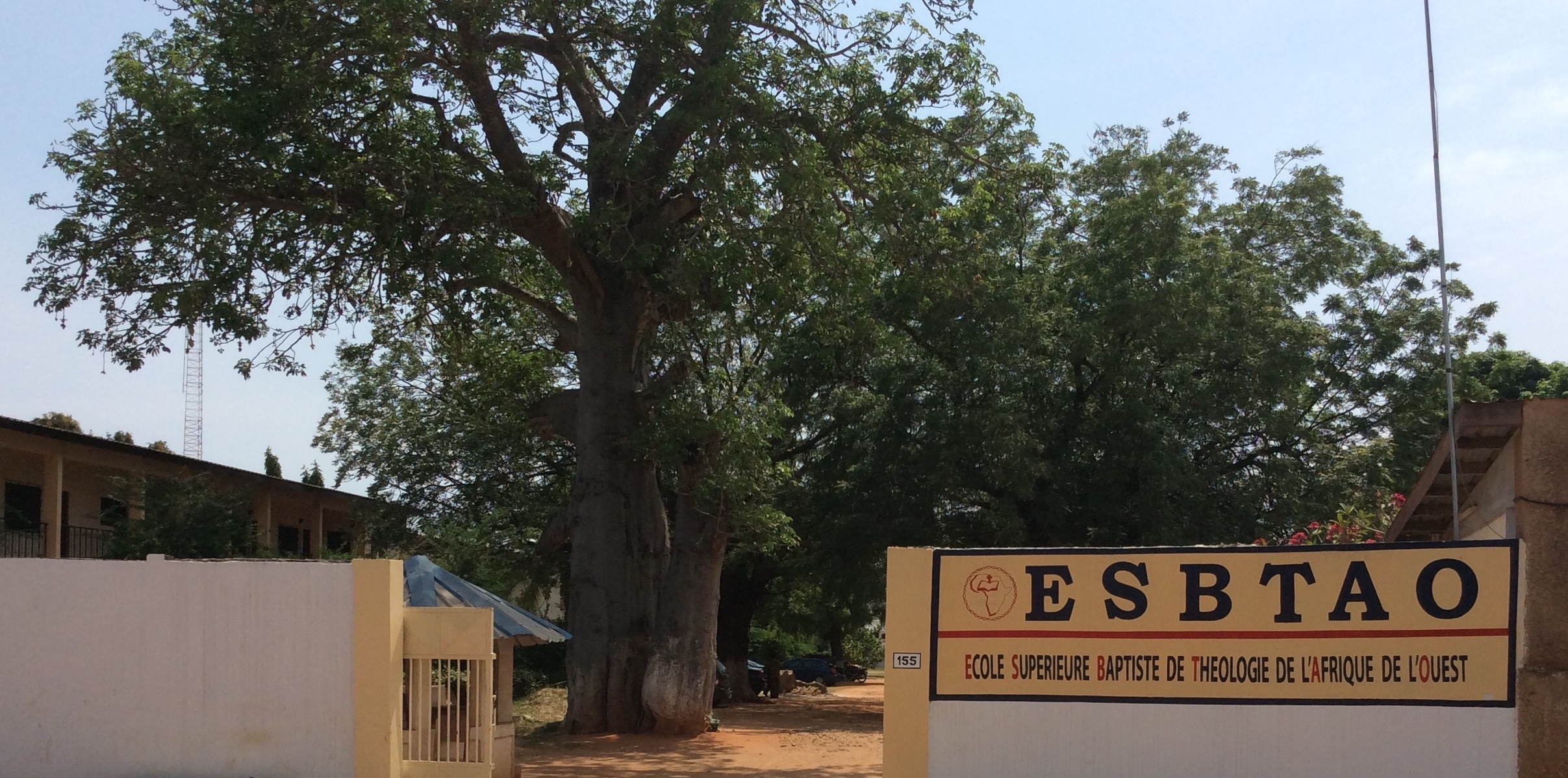
West Africa Baptist Advanced School of Theology (WABAST) in Lomé.

The Convention has its origins in the establishment of the first Baptist Church in Lomé by Nigerians in 1919 and a mission of the Ghana Baptist Convention in 1950. CBT is officially founded in 1964 under the name of "Association of Baptist Churches of Togo" (Association des Eglises Baptistes du Togo). In 1971, it participated in the founding of the West Africa Baptist Advanced School of Theology (WABAST) in Lomé. In 1983, churches were established in the Est-Mono Prefecture. In 1988, it takes the name of "Togo Baptist Convention". According to a census published by the association in 2023, it claimed 537 churches and 25,403 members.
