= Kara Region =

Region of Togo

Coordinates: 9°36′N 0°54′E

Kara
- Region
- Kara Region
- Country: Togo
- Capital: Kara

Area
  - Total: 11,738 km^{2} (4,532 sq mi)

Population (2022 census)
  - Total: 985,512
  - Density: 83.959/km^{2} (217.45/sq mi)
- HDI (2017): 0.463 low · 5th

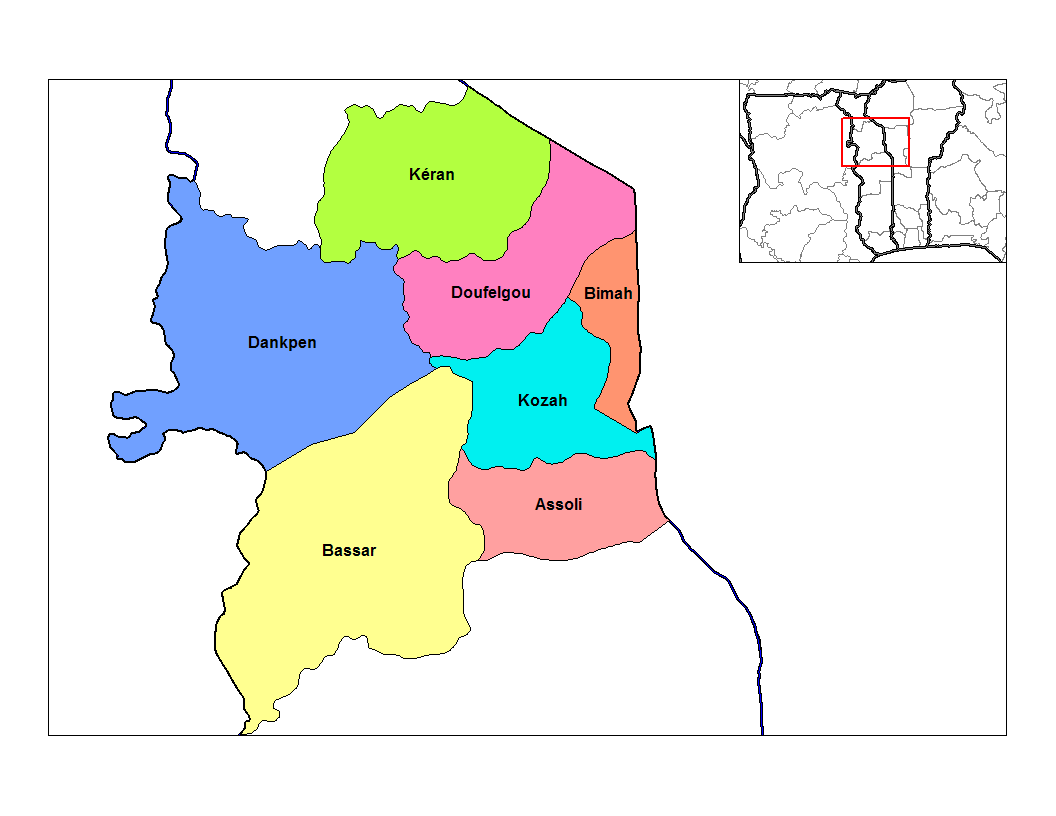
Prefectures of Kara

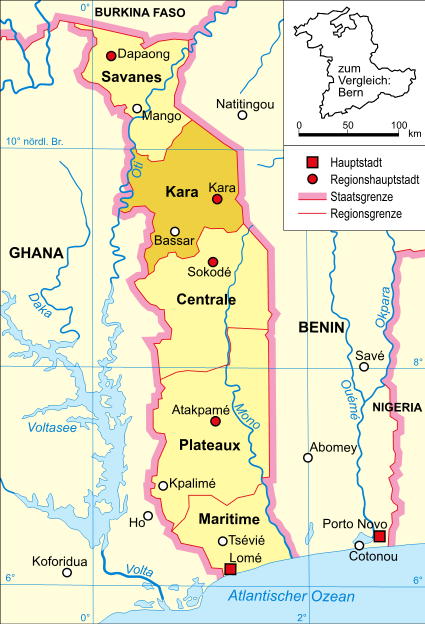
Kara Region

Kara Region (French: Région de la Kara) is one of Togo's five regions. Kara is the regional capital.

Other major cities in the Kara region include Bafilo, Bassar, Kpagouda, and Niamtougou.

Kara is divided into the prefectures of Assoli, Bassar, Bimah, Dankpen, Doufelgou, Kéran, and Kozah.

Kara is located north of Centrale Region and south of Savanes Region. To the west lies the Northern Region of Ghana, and to the east lie the Atakora (further north) and Donga (further south) Departments of Benin.

== See also ==
- Regions of Togo
