= Languages of Togo =

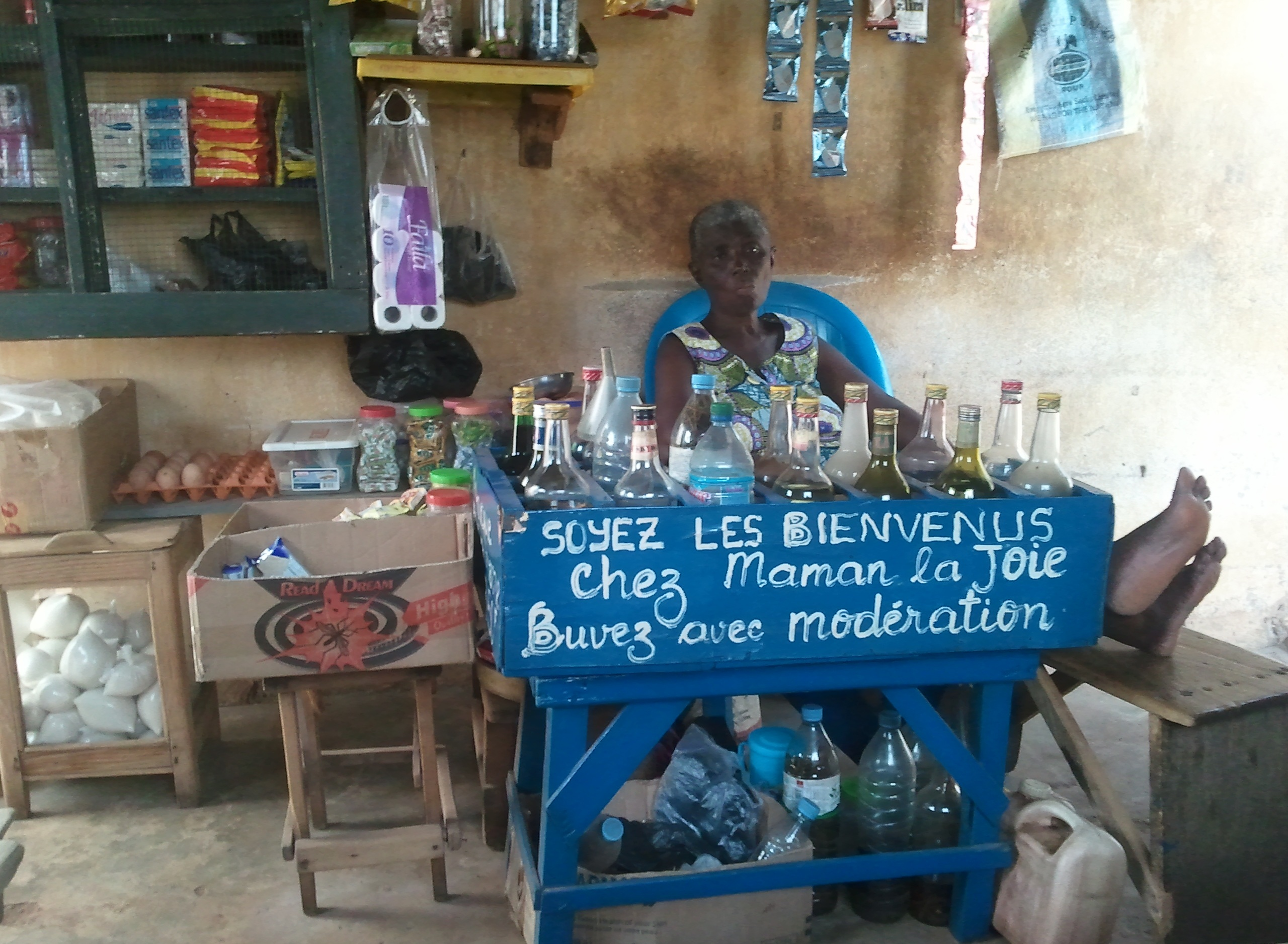
- Alcohol seller in Kara, with sign in French.
- Official: French
- National: Ewe, Kabiyé
- Vernacular: African French
- Minority: Gbe languages, Gur languages, Kwa languages; Talensi, Wasa, Aguna, Aja, Ngangam, Ntcham, Tammari, Tem, Ifè
- Immigrant: Yoruba; Hausa; Chinese, Arabic
- Foreign: Arabic; English; German
- Signed: Francophone African Sign Language
- Keyboard layout: AZERTY

Togo is a multilingual country, which according to one count has 44 languages spoken. The official language is French. In 1975, the government designated two indigenous languages - Ewé (Ewe: Èʋegbe) and Kabiyé - as national languages, meaning that they are promoted in formal education and the media. The two national languages tend to be used regionally with Ewé used in the south from Lomé to Blitta, and Kabiyé from Blitta to Dapaong in the north.

Togo is a Francophone country, where, as of 2024, 3.913 million (41.12%) out of 9.515 million people speak French.

Togo joined the Commonwealth in June 2022. Prior to its admission at the 2022 Commonwealth Heads of Government Meeting, Foreign Minister Robert Dussey said that he expected Commonwealth membership to provide opportunities for Togolese citizens to learn English and access new educational and cultural resources. He also remarked that the country sought "to forge closer ties with the anglophone world." Accordingly, the teaching of English in preschools and primary schools was introduced from 2023. The language also plays an important commercial role.

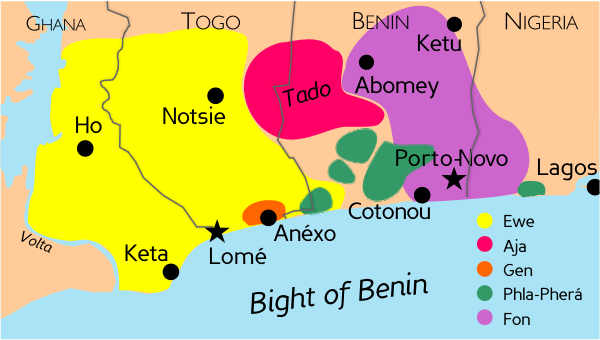
Map showing the distribution of the various Gbe languages. (after Capo 1988, 1991)
