= KDH (disambiguation) =

The KDH is the Christian Democratic Movement (Kresťanskodemokratické hnutie), a Slovak political party.

KDH may also refer for:

- Kamala Devi Harris (born 1964), 49th vice president of the United States (2021–2025)
- Kandahar International Airport, Afghanistan (IATA:KDH)
- Kill Devil Hill (band)
- Kiernan Dewsbury-Hall, English footballer
- Tem language, of West Africa (ISO 639-3:kdh
- KPop Demon Hunters, an animated musical film
