= Islam in Togo =

Islam in Togo represents around 16% of the total population. Islam came to Togo about the same time as it did much of West Africa. The vast majority of Muslims in Togo are Sunni of Maliki school of jurisprudence, there are also Ahmadiyya and Shia Muslims.

== History ==
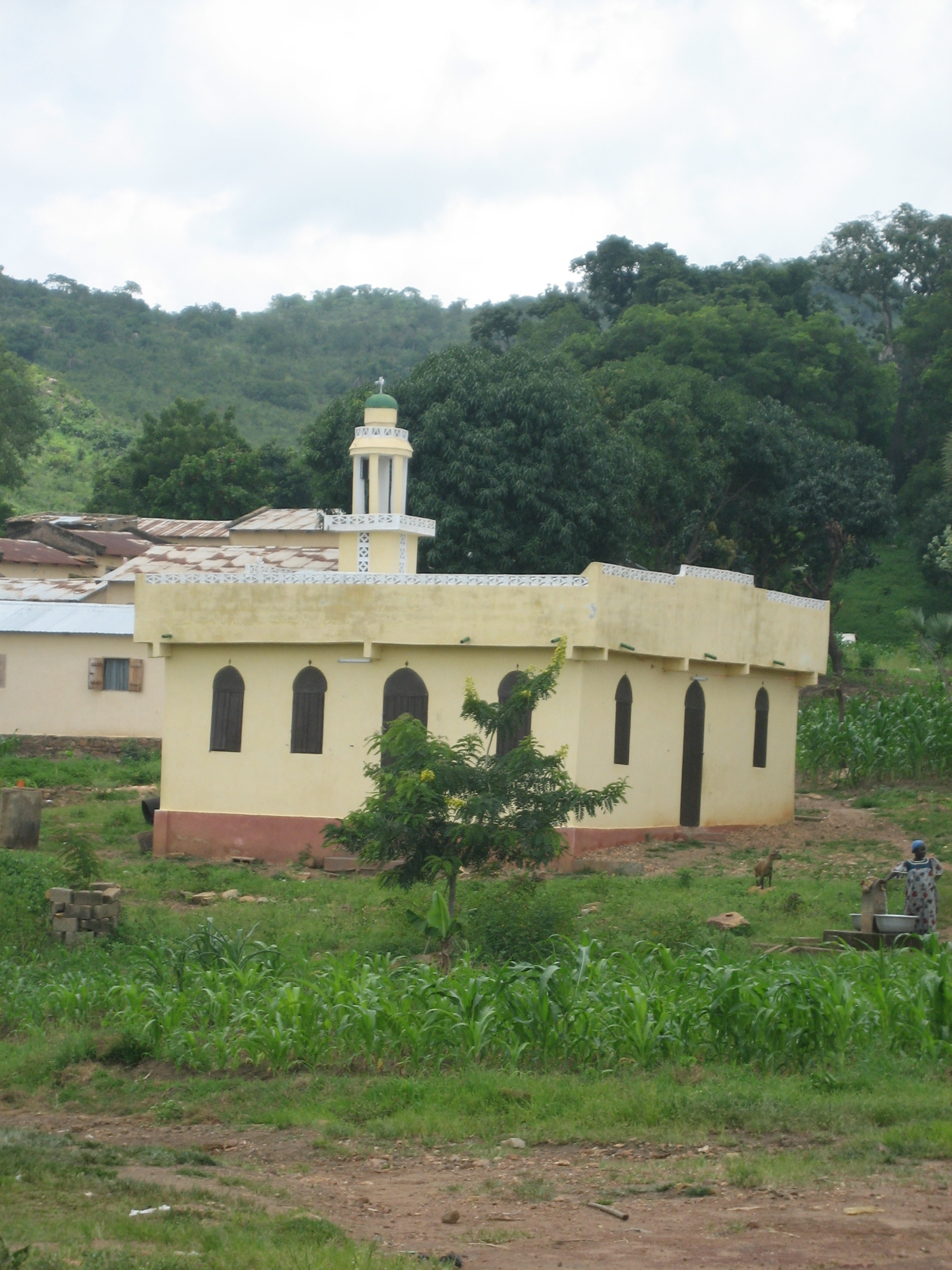
Mosque in northern Togo

Islam begun having a significant presence in northern Togo by the 18th century and spread southwards soon after. The rise of the Chokossi kingdom around the mid-18th century in northern Togo helped to establish the influence of Islam as Hausa and other Muslim merchants settled in the kingdom.

By the late 18th century, Muslim merchants expanded throughout northern Togo which led to conversions among the Tem people and others. In the south, Hausa merchants settled in the region by the late 19th century but Islam remained a minority religion.

== Demographics ==
Estimates on the number of Muslims in Togo vary depending on the source. The CIA World Factbook puts the figure at 14%. A 2020 projection by the Pew Research Center gives an estimate of 14% of the population or 1,020,000 people.

== Organizations ==
The Federation of Togo Muslims is the largest Muslim organization in the country. It takes care of the Islam-related affairs and denounces extremism.
