= Togo =

Country in West Africa

Togolese Republic République togolaise (French)
- Flag Emblem
- Motto: "Travail, Liberté, Patrie" (English: "Work, Liberty, Homeland")
- Anthem: "Terre de nos aïeux" (English: "Land of our ancestors")
- Capital and largest city: Lomé; 6°8′N 1°13′E
- Official languages: French
- Recognised national languages: Kabiye; Ewe
- Ethnic groups: African (94.4%): Aja, Ewe and Mina (42.4%); Kabye and Tem (25.9%); Akan and Gurma (17.1%); Kposo and Akebu (4.1%); Ana-Ife (3.2%); Other West African groups (1.7%); non-African (5.6%)
- Religion (2022 census): 49.2% Christianity; 18.6% Islam; 17.0% traditional faiths; 9.4% none; 5.8% other
- Demonym: Togolese
- Government: Unitary parliamentary republic under an authoritarian dictatorship
  - President: Jean-Lucien Savi de Tové
  - Prime Minister: Faure Gnassingbé
- Legislature: Parliament
  - Upper house: Senate
  - Lower house: National Assembly

Establishment history
  - German Togoland: 5 July 1884
  - French Togoland: 27 August 1914
  - Independence from France: 27 April 1960
  - Admission to the UN: 20 September 1960
  - Current constitution: 6 May 2024

Area
  - Total: 56,785 km^{2} (21,925 sq mi) (123rd)
  - Water (%): 4.2

Population
  - 2024 estimate: ▲9,583,381 (101st)
  - 2022 census: 8,095,498
  - Density: 125.9/km^{2} (326.1/sq mi)
- GDP (PPP): 2025 estimate
  - Total: ▲$33.050 billion (147th)
  - Per capita: ▲$3,470 (166th)
- GDP (nominal): 2025 estimate
  - Total: ▲$10.020 billion (151st)
  - Per capita: ▲$1,050 (171st)
- Gini (2015): ▼43.1 medium inequality
- HDI (2023): ▲0.571 medium (161st)
- Currency: West African CFA franc (XOF)
- Time zone: UTC+00:00 (GMT)
- Date format: dd/mm/yyyy
- Calling code: +228
- ISO 3166 code: TG
- Internet TLD: .tg
- 1. Such as Ewe, Mina and Aja.; 2. Largest are the Ewe, Mina, Kotokoli Tem and Kabyè.; 3. Mostly European, Indian & Syrian-Lebanese.; 4. Estimates for this country explicitly take into account the effects of excess mortality due to AIDS; this can result in lower life expectancy, higher infant mortality and death rates, lower population and growth rates, and changes in the distribution of population by age and sex than would otherwise be expected.; 5. Rankings based on 2017 figures (CIA World Factbook – "Togo")

Togo, (Note: /ˈtoʊɡoʊ/ TOH-goh; French: [toɡo]) officially the Togolese Republic, (Note: French: République togolaise) is a country located in West Africa. It is bordered by Ghana to the west, Benin to the east and Burkina Faso to the north. It is one of the least developed countries in the world and has a lower-middle income economy. It extends north from the Gulf of Guinea (where its capital, Lomé, is located) to the Burkina Faso–Togo border. It is a small, tropical country, spanning 57,000 square kilometres (22,000 square miles) with a population of approximately 8 million. It has a width of less than 115 km (71 mi) between Ghana and its eastern neighbour Benin.

Various people settled the boundaries of present-day Togo between the 11th and 16th centuries. Between the 16th and 18th centuries, the coastal region served primarily as a European slave trading outpost, earning Togo and the surrounding region the name "The Slave Coast". In 1884, during the scramble for Africa, Germany established a protectorate in the region called Togoland. After World War I, Togo was transferred to France with its contemporary borders. Togo gained independence from France in 1960. In 1967, Gnassingbé Eyadéma led a successful military coup d'état and became president of an anti-communist, single-party state. In 1993, Eyadéma faced multiparty elections marred by irregularities, and won the presidency three times. At the time of his death, Eyadéma was the "longest-serving leader in modern African history", having been president for 38 years. In 2005, his son Faure Gnassingbé was elected president.

Togo is a tropical, sub-Saharan nation whose economy depends mostly on agriculture. The official language is French, while the two national languages are Kabiye and Ewe. Other languages are also spoken, particularly those of the Gbe family. Christians represent roughly half of the population (49.2%), followed by Muslims and adherents of traditional religions. Togo is a member of the United Nations, African Union, Organisation of Islamic Cooperation, South Atlantic Peace and Cooperation Zone, Francophonie, Commonwealth of Nations, and Economic Community of West African States.

== Etymology ==
The name of Togo means "by the water" or "behind the sea", derived from Ewe to ("water") and go ("shore"). Originally it just referred to the town of Togo (now Togoville); later, the Germans extended the name to the whole nation.

Since the country's independence in 1960, the official name of the state is République togolaise ("Togolese Republic").

== History ==
Archaeological finds indicate that societies were able to produce pottery and process iron. The name Togo is translated from the Ewe language as "behind the river". During the period from the 11th century to the 16th century, the Ewé entered the area from the west, and the Mina and Gun from the east. Most of them settled on the coast. The Atlantic slave trade began in the 16th century, and for the next two hundred years the coastal region was a trading centre for Europeans in search of slaves, earning Togo and the surrounding region the name "The Slave Coast".

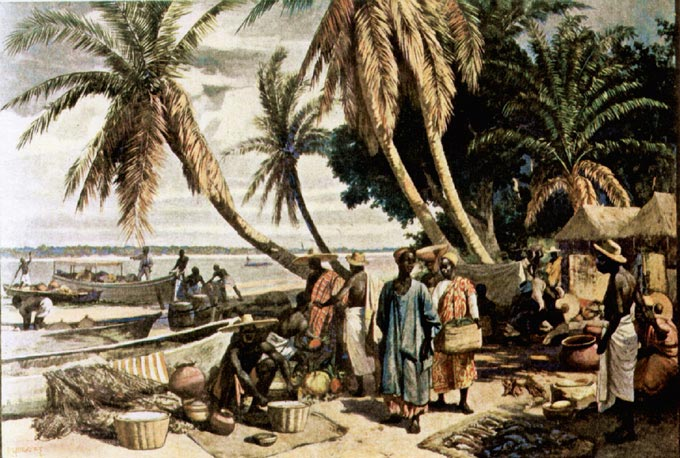
Togoland (Rudolf Hellgrewe, 1908)

In 1884, a paper was forcibly signed at Togoville with King Mlapa III, whereby Germany claimed a protectorate over a stretch of territory along the coast and gradually extended its control inland. Its borders were defined after the capture of the hinterland by German forces and signing agreements with France and Britain. In 1905, this became the German colony of Togoland. The local population was forced to work, cultivate cotton, coffee, and cocoa and pay taxes. A railway and the port of Lomé were built for export of agricultural products. The Germans introduced techniques of cultivation of cocoa, coffee and cotton and developed the infrastructure.

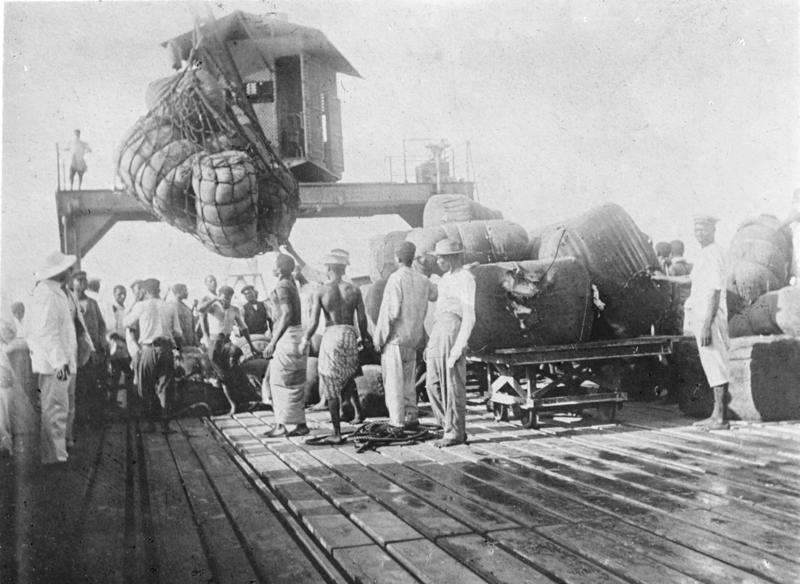
Cotton is loaded onto a ship in the German colony of Togoland, 1885

During World War I, Togoland was invaded by Britain and France, proclaiming the Anglo-French condominium, during the West African Campaign. Following the Allied invasion of the colony in August 1914, German forces were defeated, forcing the colony's surrender on 26 August 1914. On 7 December 1916, the condominium collapsed and Togoland was subsequently partitioned into British and French zones, creating the colonies of British Togoland and French Togoland. On 20 July 1922, Great Britain received the League of Nations mandate to govern the western part of Togo and France to govern the eastern part. In 1945, the country received the right to send three representatives to the French parliament.

After World War II, these mandates became UN Trust Territories. French Togoland became an autonomous republic within the French Union in 1956, while France retained the right to control defence, foreign relations, and finances. The residents of British Togoland voted to join the Gold Coast as part of the independent nation of Ghana in 1957.

=== Independence ===
The Togolese Republic was proclaimed on 27 April 1960. In the Togolese general election, 1961, Sylvanus Olympio became the first president, gaining 100 per cent of the vote in elections boycotted by the opposition. On 9 April 1961, the Constitution of the Togolese Republic was adopted, according to which the supreme legislative body was the National Assembly of Togo. In December 1961, leaders of opposition parties were arrested because they were accused of the preparation of an anti-government conspiracy. A decree was issued on the dissolution of the opposition parties. Olympio tried to reduce dependence on France by establishing cooperation with the United States, United Kingdom, and West Germany. He rejected the efforts of French soldiers who were demobilised after the Algerian War and tried to get a position in the Togolese army. These factors eventually led to a military coup on 13 January 1963 during which he was assassinated by a group of soldiers under the direction of Sergeant Gnassingbé Eyadéma. A state of emergency was declared in Togo. The military handed over power to an interim government led by Nicolas Grunitzky. In May 1963, Grunitzky was elected President of the Republic. The new leadership pursued a policy of developing relations with France. His main aim was to dampen the divisions between north and south, promulgate a new constitution, and introduce a multiparty system.

On 13 January 1967, Eyadéma overthrew Grunitzky in a bloodless coup and assumed the presidency. He created the Rally of the Togolese People Party, banned activities of other political parties and introduced a one-party system in November 1969. He was reelected in 1979 and 1986. In 1983, the privatisation programme launched and in 1991 other political parties were allowed. In 1993, the European Union froze the partnership, describing Eyadéma's re-election in 1993, 1998 and 2003, as a seizure of power. In April 2004, in Brussels, talks were held between the EU and Togo on the resumption of cooperation.

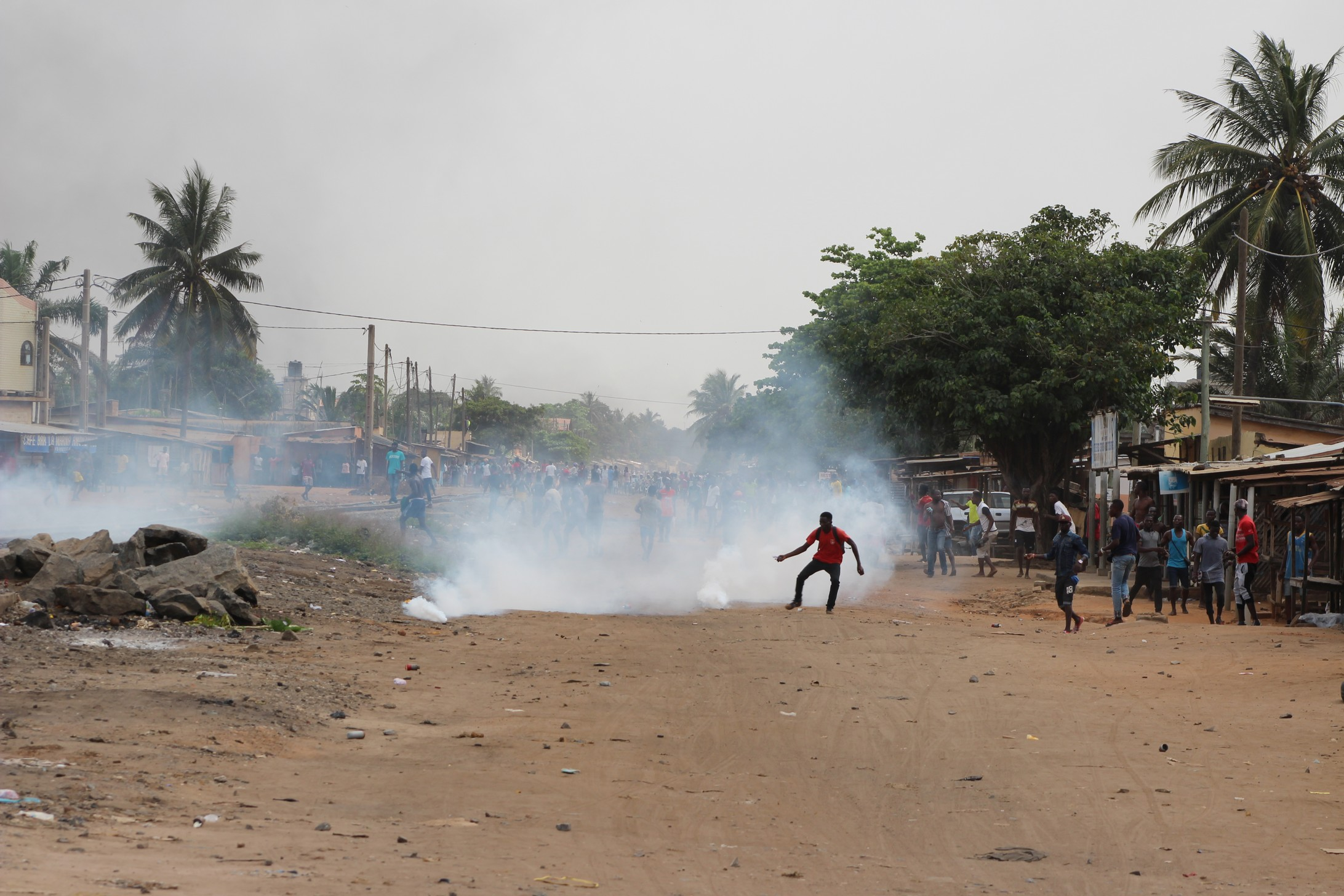
The 2017–18 Togolese protests against the 50-year rule of the Gnassingbé family

Eyadéma Gnassingbé died on Saturday, 5 February 2005. The military's installation of his son, Faure Gnassingbé, as president provoked international condemnation, except from France. Some "democratically elected" African leaders such as Abdoulaye Wade of Senegal and Olusegun Obasanjo of Nigeria supported the move, creating a rift within the African Union. Gnassingbé left power and held elections, which he won two months later. The opposition declared that the election results were fraudulent. The events of 2005 led to questions regarding the government's commitment to democracy that had been made in an attempt to normalise relations with the EU which cut off aid in 1993 due to questions about Togo's human rights situation. Up to 400 people were killed in the violence surrounding the presidential elections, according to the UN. Around 40,000 Togolese fled to neighbouring countries. Gnassingbé was reelected in 2010 and 2015.

In 2017, anti-government protests erupted. UN condemned the resulting crackdown by security forces, and The Gambia's foreign minister, Ousainou Darboe, had to issue a correction after saying that Gnassingbé should resign.

In the February 2020 presidential elections, Gnassingbé won his fourth presidential term in office as the president of Togo. According to the official result, he won with a margin of around 72% of the vote share. This enabled him to defeat his closest challenger, former prime minister Agbeyome Kodjo, who had 18%. On 4 May 2020, Bitala Madjoulba, the commander of a Togolese military battalion, was found dead in his office one day after Gnassingbé was sworn in for his fourth term. An investigation was opened for this case, resulting in Major General Kadangha Abalo Felix being prosecuted and tried for involvement in Madjoulba's assassination and 'conspiracy against the internal security of the state'.

=== Joining the Commonwealth ===
Togo joined the Commonwealth in June 2022. Prior to its admission at the 2022 Commonwealth Heads of Government Meeting, Foreign Minister Robert Dussey said that he expected Commonwealth membership to provide new export markets, funding for development projects and opportunities for Togolese citizens to learn English and access new educational and cultural resources.

== Government ==
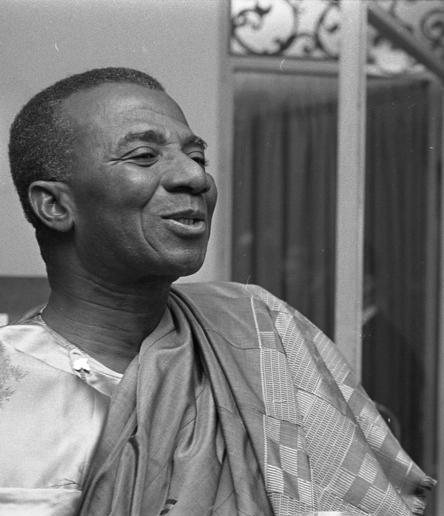
Sylvanus Olympio, the first president of Togo from 1960 to 1963

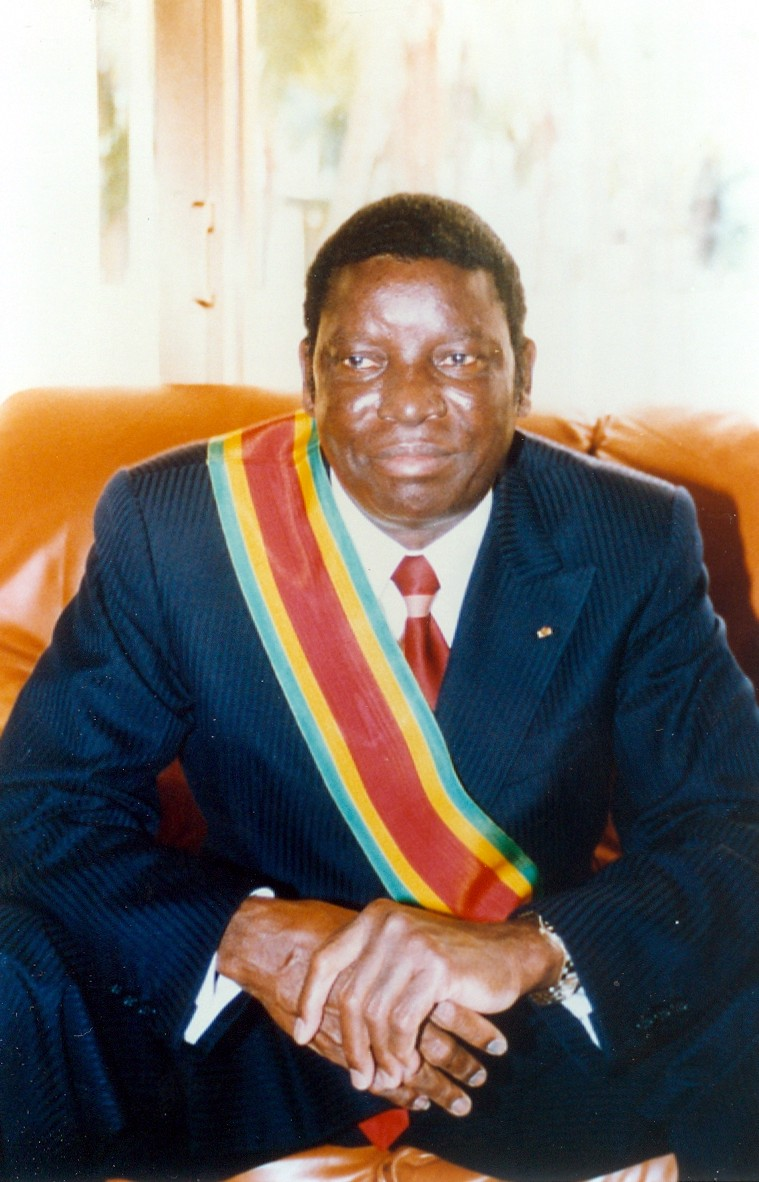
Gnassingbé Eyadéma, the third and longest-serving president from 1967 until his death in 2005.

The president is indirectly elected for a double term of four years, and is the commander-in-chief of the armed forces and has the right to initiate legislation and dissolve parliament. Executive power is exercised by the council of ministers and its president which is the head of government and is also a position that was formerly known as the prime minister. The president appoints the president of the Council of Ministers.

President Gnassingbé Eyadéma, who until 1993, ruled Togo under a one-party system, died of a heart attack on 5 February 2005. Under the Togolese Constitution, the President of the Parliament, Fambaré Ouattara Natchaba, should have become president of the country, pending a presidential election to be called within 60 days. Natchaba was out of the country, returning on an Air France plane from Paris. The Togolese army, known as Forces Armées Togolaises (FAT), or Togolese Armed Forces, closed the nation's borders, forcing the plane to land in Benin. With an engineered power vacuum, the Parliament voted to remove the constitutional clause that would have required an election within 60 days and declared that Eyadema's son, Faure Gnassingbé, would inherit the presidency and hold office for the rest of his father's term. Faure was sworn in on 7 February 2005, with international criticism of the succession. The African Union described the takeover as a military coup d'état. International pressure also came from the United Nations. Within Togo, opposition to the takeover culminated in riots in which between 400 and 500 people died. There were uprisings in cities and towns mainly in the southern part of the country. In the town of Aného reports of a general civilian uprising followed by a massacre by government troops. In response, Gnassingbé agreed to hold elections and on 25 February, Gnassingbé resigned as president, and afterward accepted the nomination to run for the office in April.

On 24 April 2005, Gnassingbé was elected president of Togo, receiving over 60% of the vote according to official results. His main rival in the race had been Emmanuel Bob-Akitani from the Union des Forces du Changement (UFC). Electoral fraud was suspected due to a lack of independent domestic or foreign oversight. Parliament designated Deputy President Bonfoh Abbass as interim president until the inauguration. On 3 May 2005, Gnassingbé was sworn in as the new president and the European Union suspended aid to Togo in support of the opposition claims, unlike the African Union and the United States which declared the vote "reasonably fair". The Nigerian president and Chair of AU, Olusẹgun Ọbasanjọ, sought to negotiate between the incumbent government and the opposition to establish a coalition government, and rejected an AU Commission appointment of former Zambian president, Kenneth Kaunda, as special AU envoy to Togo. In June, Gnassingbé named opposition leader Edem Kodjo as the prime minister.

In October 2007, after postponements, elections were held under proportional representation. This allowed the less populated north to seat as many MPs as the more populated south. The president-backed party Rally of the Togolese People (RPT) won a majority with UFC coming second and the other parties claiming inconsequential representation. Vote rigging accusations were levelled at RPT supported by the civil and military security apparatus. With the presence of an EU observer mission, cancelled ballots and illegal voting took place, the majority of which in RPT strongholds. On 3 December 2007 Komlan Mally of RPT was appointed to prime minister succeeding Agboyibor. On 5 September 2008, Mally resigned as prime minister of Togo.

Faure Gnassingbé, Chairman of the Council of Ministers of Togo, at the 2026 SCO summit in Bishkek, Kyrgyzstan, 1 September 2026

Gnassingbé won re-election in the March 2010 presidential election, taking 61% of the vote against Jean-Pierre Fabre from UFC, who had been backed by an opposition coalition called FRAC (Republican Front for Change). Electoral observers noted "procedural errors" and technical problems, and the opposition did not recognise the results, claiming irregularities had affected the outcome. Periodic protests against Faure Gnassingbé followed the election. In May 2010, opposition leader Gilchrist Olympio announced that he would enter into a power-sharing deal with the government, a coalition arrangement which provides UFC with eight ministerial posts. In June 2012, electoral reforms prompted protesters to take to the street in Lomé for days; protesters sought a return to the 1992 constitution that would re-establish presidential term limits. July 2012 saw the resignation of the prime minister, Gilbert Houngbo. Days later, the commerce minister, Kwesi Ahoomey-Zunu, was named to lead the new government. In the same month, the home of opposition leader Jean-Pierre Fabre was raided by security forces, and thousands of protesters again rallied publicly against the government crackdown.

In April 2015, Gnassingbé was re-elected for a third term. In February 2020, Gnassingbé was again re-elected for his fourth presidential term. The opposition had accusations of fraud and irregularities. The Gnassingbé family has ruled Togo since 1967, making it Africa's longest lasting dynasty.

=== 2024 constitutional reform ===
In March 2024, Gnassingbé presented a new constitution. One of the constitutional changes in the new constitution has Togo go from being under a presidential system to being under a parliamentary system, as well as weakening the power of the president, it becoming a mostly ceremonial role; strengthening the power of parliament; and strengthening the power of the prime minister and renaming the office "President of the Council of Ministers" (French: Président du Conseil des Ministres). The term of the new office will be six years, renewable indefinitely, whereas the term of the president is lowered to four from the previous five, renewable once. In April 2024, the Togolese parliament voted in favour of the new constitution and the new constitution was officially adopted on 6 May 2024.

The reform officially came into effect on 3 May 2025, where the first indirect election of the country was held. Jean-Lucien Savi de Tové was unanimously elected as the new president, while Gnassingbé became the president of the Council of Ministers. Aged nearly 86, Savi de Tové is the oldest ever president in history.

=== Administrative divisions ===
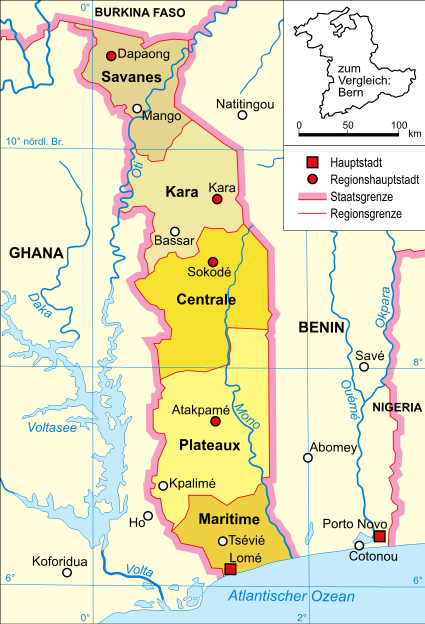
Map of Togo featuring the country's five regions and their capitals

Togo is divided into 5 regions which are subdivided in turn into 39 prefectures. From north to south the regions are Savanes, Kara, Centrale, Plateaux and Maritime.

=== Foreign relations ===
While Togo's foreign policy is nonaligned, it has historical and cultural ties with western Europe, especially France and Germany. Togo recognises the People's Republic of China, North Korea, and Cuba. It re-established relations with Israel in 1987. Togo pursues an active foreign policy and participates in international organisations. It is particularly active in West African regional affairs and in the African Union.

In 2017, Togo signed the UN treaty on the Prohibition of Nuclear Weapons. Togo joined the Commonwealth of Nations, along with Gabon, at the 2022 Commonwealth Heads of Government Meeting in Kigali, Rwanda. In joining the Commonwealth, Foreign Minister Robert Dussey told Reuters, the country sought to expand its "diplomatic, political and economic network" and to "forge closer ties with the anglophone world."

=== Military ===
FAT (Forces armées togolaises, "Togolese armed forces"), consists of the army, navy, air force, and gendarmerie. Total military expenditures during the fiscal year of 2005 totalled 1.6% of the country's GDP. Military bases exist in Lomé, Temedja, Kara, Niamtougou, and Dapaong. The current Chief of the General Staff is Brigadier General Titikpina Atcha Mohamed, who took office on 19 May 2009. The air force is equipped with Alpha jets.

=== Human rights ===
Togo was labelled "Not Free" by Freedom House from 1972 to 1998 and from 2002 to 2006, and has been categorised as "Partly Free" from 1999 to 2001 and from 2007. According to a U.S. State Department report based on conditions in 2010, human rights problems include "security force use of excessive force, including torture, which resulted in deaths and injuries; official impunity; harsh and life-threatening prison conditions; arbitrary arrests and detention; lengthy pretrial detention; executive influence over the judiciary; infringement of citizens' privacy rights; restrictions on freedoms of press, assembly, and movement; official corruption; discrimination and violence against women; child abuse, including female genital mutilation (FGM), and sexual exploitation of children; regional and ethnic discrimination; trafficking in persons, especially women and children; societal discrimination against persons with disabilities; official and societal discrimination against homosexual persons; societal discrimination against persons with HIV; and forced labour, including by children." Same-sex sexual activity is illegal in Togo, with a penalty of one to three years imprisonment.

== Geography ==
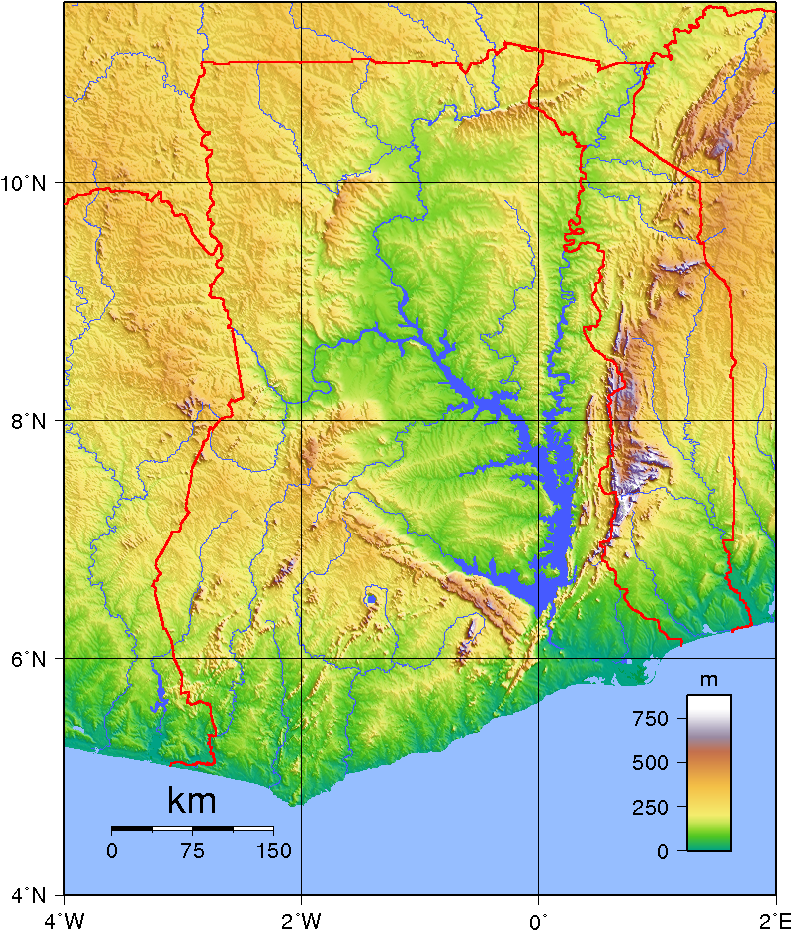
Ghana-Togo topography−topographic map

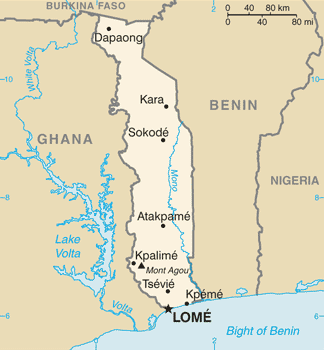
Map of Togo

Togo has an area equal to 56,785 km^{2} (21,925 sq mi). It borders the Bight of Benin in the south; Ghana lies to the west; Benin to the east; and to the north, it is bound by Burkina Faso. North of the equator, it lies mostly between latitudes 6° and 11°N, and longitudes 0° and 2°E.

The coast of Togo in the Gulf of Guinea is 56 km (35 mi) long and consists of lagoons with sandy beaches. In the north, the land is characterised by a rolling savannah in contrast to the centre of the country, which is characterised by hills. The south of Togo is characterised by a savannah and woodland plateau which reaches a coastal plain with lagoons and marshes. The highest mountain of the country is the Mont Agou at 986 metres (3,235 ft) above sea level. The longest river is the Mono River with a length of 400 km (250 mi). It runs from north to south.

The climate is "generally tropical" with average temperatures ranging from 23 °C (73 °F) on the coast to about 30 °C (86 °F) in the northernmost regions, with a drier climate and characteristics of a tropical savannah.

Togo contains three terrestrial ecoregions: Eastern Guinean forests, Guinean forest-savannah mosaic, and West Sudanian savannah. The coast of Togo is characterised by marshes and mangroves. The country had a 2019 Forest Landscape Integrity Index mean score of 5.88/10, ranking it 92nd globally out of 172 countries.

At least five parks and reserves have been established: Abdoulaye Faunal Reserve, Fazao Malfakassa National Park, Fosse aux Lions National Park, Koutammakou, and Kéran National Park.

== Economy ==
The country possesses phosphate deposits and an export sector based on agricultural products such as coffee, cocoa bean, and peanuts (groundnuts), which together generate roughly 30% of export earnings. Cotton is a cash crop. The fertile land occupies 11.3% of the country, most of which is developed. Some crops are cassava, jasmine rice, maize and millet. Some other sectors are brewery and the textile industry. Low market prices for Togo's major export commodities coupled with the volatile political situation of the 1990s and 2000s had a negative effect on the economy.

It is listed in the least developed country group. However, Togo was recently considered to have a lower-middle income as a 2022 census shows the population was reduced by 11.7% along with steady GDP growth as of 2026. It serves as a regional commercial and trade centre. The government's decade-long efforts supported by the World Bank and the International Monetary Fund (IMF) to carry out economic reforms, to encourage investments, and to create the balance between income and consumption has stalled. Political unrest, including private and public sector strikes throughout 1992 and 1993, jeopardised the reform programme, shrank the tax base, and disrupted economic activities in the country.

It imports machinery, equipment, petroleum products, and food. Its main import partners are France (21.1%), the Netherlands (12.1%), Côte d'Ivoire (5.9%), Germany (4.6%), Italy (4.4%), South Africa (4.3%) and China (4.1%). The main exports are cocoa, coffee, re-export of goods, phosphates and cotton. "Major export partners" are Burkina Faso (16.6%), China (15.4%), the Netherlands (13%), Benin (9.6%) and Mali (7.4%).

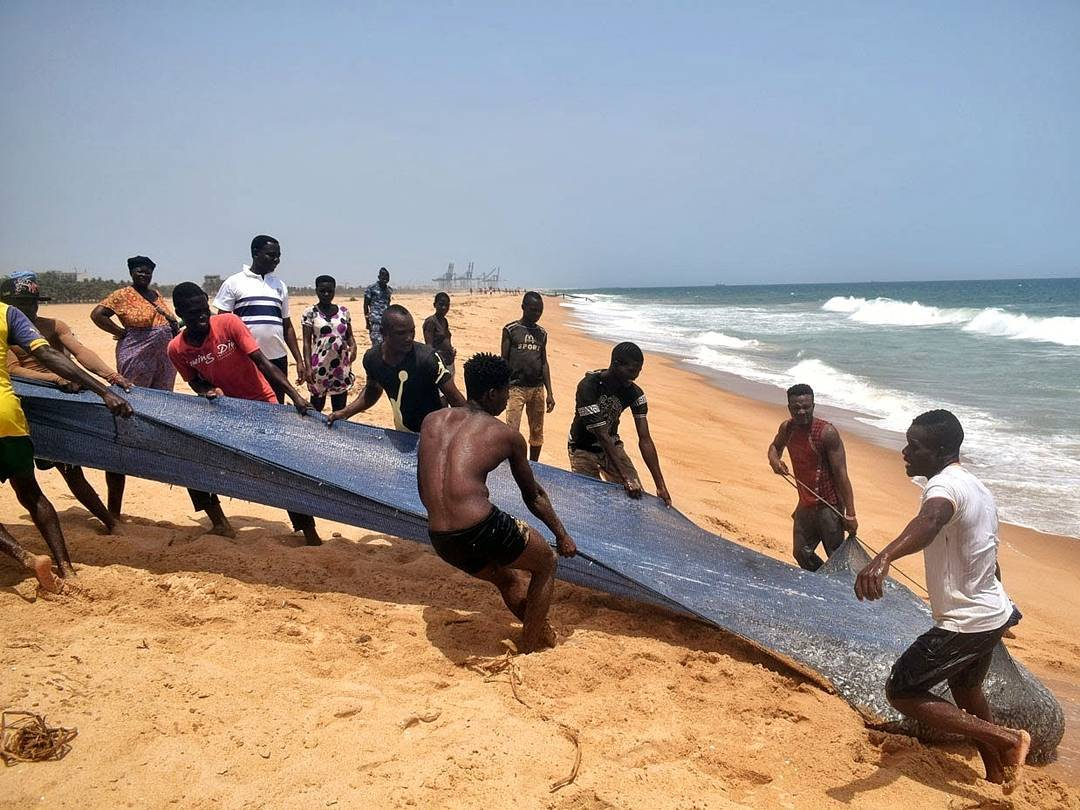
Fishermen

In terms of structural reforms, it has made progress in the liberalisation of the economy, namely in the fields of trade and port activities. The privatisation programme of the cotton sector, telecommunications and water supply has stalled.

On 12 January 1994, the devaluation of the currency by 50% provided an impetus to renewed structural adjustment; these efforts were facilitated by the end of strife in 1994 and a return to overt political calm. Progress depends on increased openness in government financial operations (to accommodate increased social service outlays) and possible downsizing of the armed forces, on which the regime has depended to stay in place. Lack of aid and depressed cocoa prices generated a 1% fall in GDP in 1998, with growth resuming in 1999. Togo is a member of the Organization for the Harmonization of Business Law in Africa (OHADA).

Agriculture is the "backbone" of the economy. A shortage of funds for the purchase of irrigation equipment and fertilisers has reduced agricultural output. Agriculture generated 28.2% of GDP in 2012 and employed 49% of the working population in 2010. The country is essentially self-sufficient in food production. Livestock production is dominated by cattle breeding.

Mining generated about 33.9% of GDP in 2012 and employed 12% of the population in 2010. Togo's gold production in 2015 is 16 metric tons. Togo has the fourth-largest phosphate deposits in the world. Their production is 2.1 million tons per year. There are reserves of limestone, marble and salt. Industry provides 20.4% of Togo's national income, as it consists of light industries and builders. Some reserves of limestone allow Togo to produce cement.

=== Road ===
Togo has a road network of 7,520 km (4,670 mi) as of 2000, with no updated data as of 2023. It has only two major highways, Highway N1 and N2, connecting the capital, Lomé with the city of Dapaong, where it gets diverged northwards to Burkina Faso and from there north-west to Mali, and north-east to Niger. N1 is the longest highway of Togo, at a length of 613 km (381 mi). N2 connects Lomé with Aneho. The extension of N2 is Highway RNIE1, or the Trans–West African Coastal Highway, from Aneho to Cotonou in Benin. Other roads and highways are local and regional roads in the rest of the country, also passing through borders with the neighbouring countries. The Trans–West African Coastal Highway crosses Togo, connecting it to Benin and Nigeria to the east, and Ghana and Ivory Coast to the west. Once the construction in Liberia and Sierra Leone part gets completed, the highway will continue west to seven other Economic Community of West African States (ECOWAS) nations.

=== Railways ===
Railway network of Togo

Togo has a railway network of 568 km (353 mi) as of 2008, with no further updates in the network as of 2023. It follows a track gauge of 1,000 mm (3 ft 3 3/8 in) (narrow gauge) Trains are operated by Société Nationale des Chemins de Fer Togolais (SNCT), which was established as a result of the restructuring and renaming of Réseau des Chemins de Fer du Togo from 1997 to 1998. Between Hahotoé and the port of Kpémé, the Compagnie Togolaise des Mines du Bénin (CTMB) operated phosphate trains.

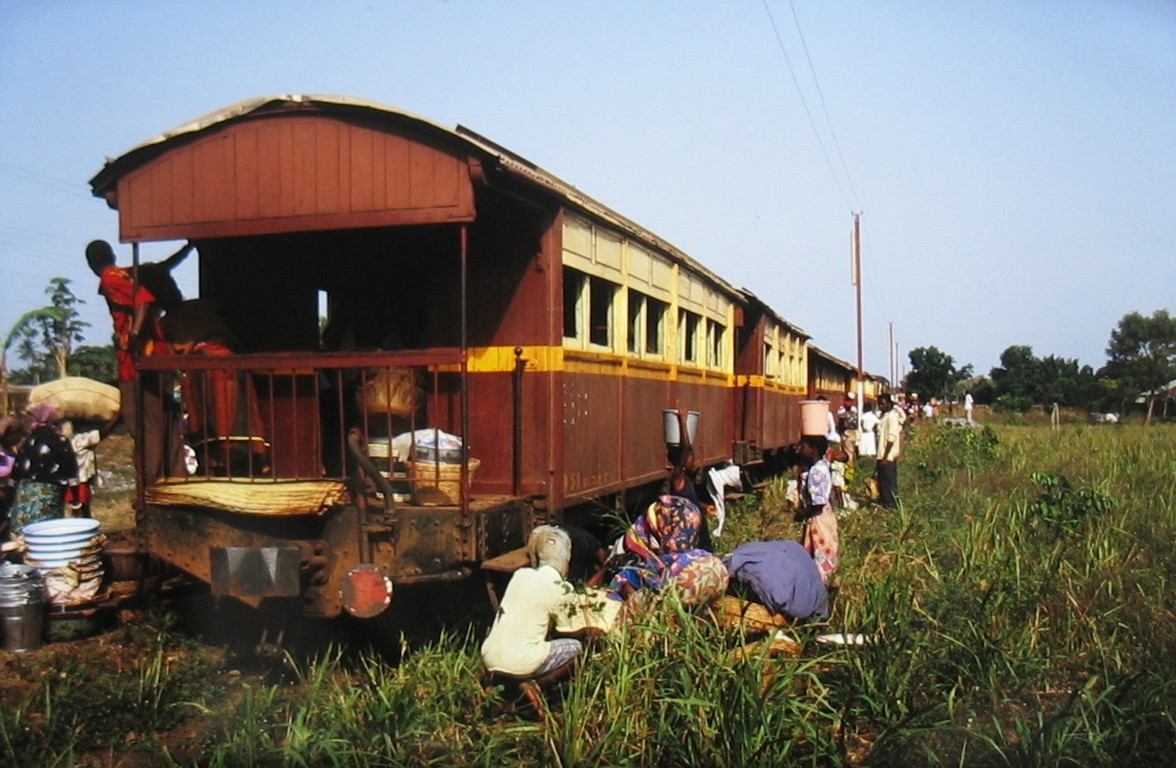
A train from Lomé to Kpalimé, at an intermediate station

The following are the railway networks present in the country:

- Lomé–Aného railway
- Lomé–Blitta railway
- Lomé–Kpalimé railway
- Hahotoé–Kpémé railway (operated by CTMB)

=== Air ===
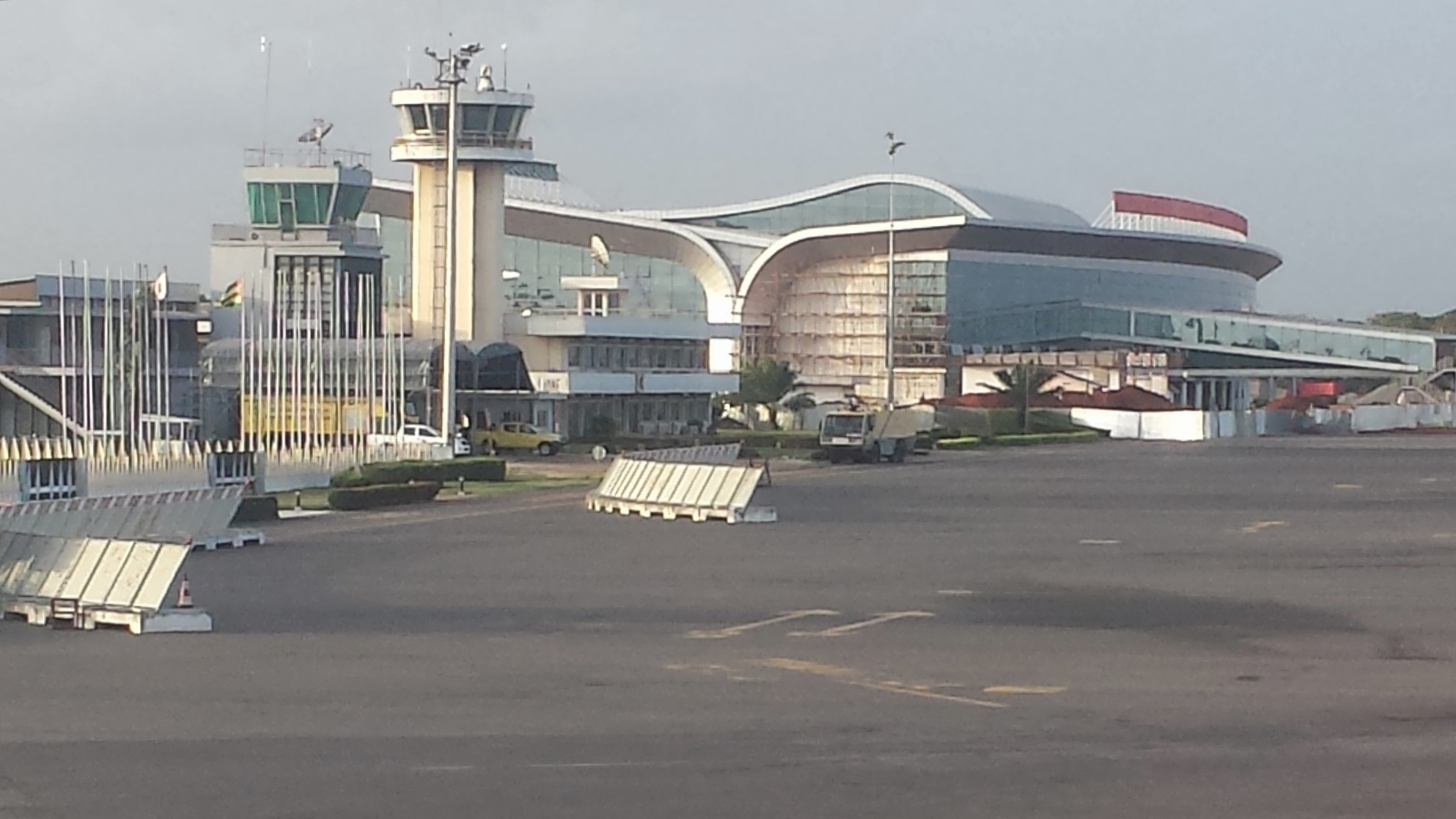
Lomé–Tokoin International Airport

Togo has a total of seven airports, of which two are international airports and six are domestic airports. The primary international airport is Lomé–Tokoin International Airport (IATA: LFW; ICAO: DXXX), officially named Gnassingbé Eyadéma International Airport, located northeast of Lomé city centre. In 2016, a new 21,000 square meter terminal backed by a US $150 million investment was opened, tripling the airport's handling capacity to up to 2 million passengers per year. In 2024, passenger traffic reached approximately 1.5 million, representing as 6.2% increasing over 2023, with further growth projected. The airport ranks among the top 50 busiest airport in Africa and records approximately 18,200 aircraft movement annually.

The main carrier at Lomé-Tokoin is ASKY Airlines, a private pan-African airline headquartered in Lomé with its operational hub at the airport. Founded in 2010 with support from Airlines, ASKY serves more than 30 destinations across West, Central, East and Southern Africa, making Lomé an important regional aviation Hub. In March 2024, Togo Airline commenced operation with its inaugural flight at Lomé-Tokoin, marking a new stage in the country's civil aviation development.

The second international airport is Niamtougou International Airport (ATA: LRL; ICAO: DXNG), located in Baga, 4km north of the town of Niamtougou in the Kara Region, serving the northern part of the country. The airport opened in 1981, features a 2,000 m x 45 m runway, and is primarily used for military and government aviation. Five smaller domestic airstrips serve other regions of the country, including Akpaka Airport near Atakpamé, Djangou Airport near Dapaong, Sansanné-Mango Airport, Sokodé Airport, and Kolokope Airport.

=== Water ===
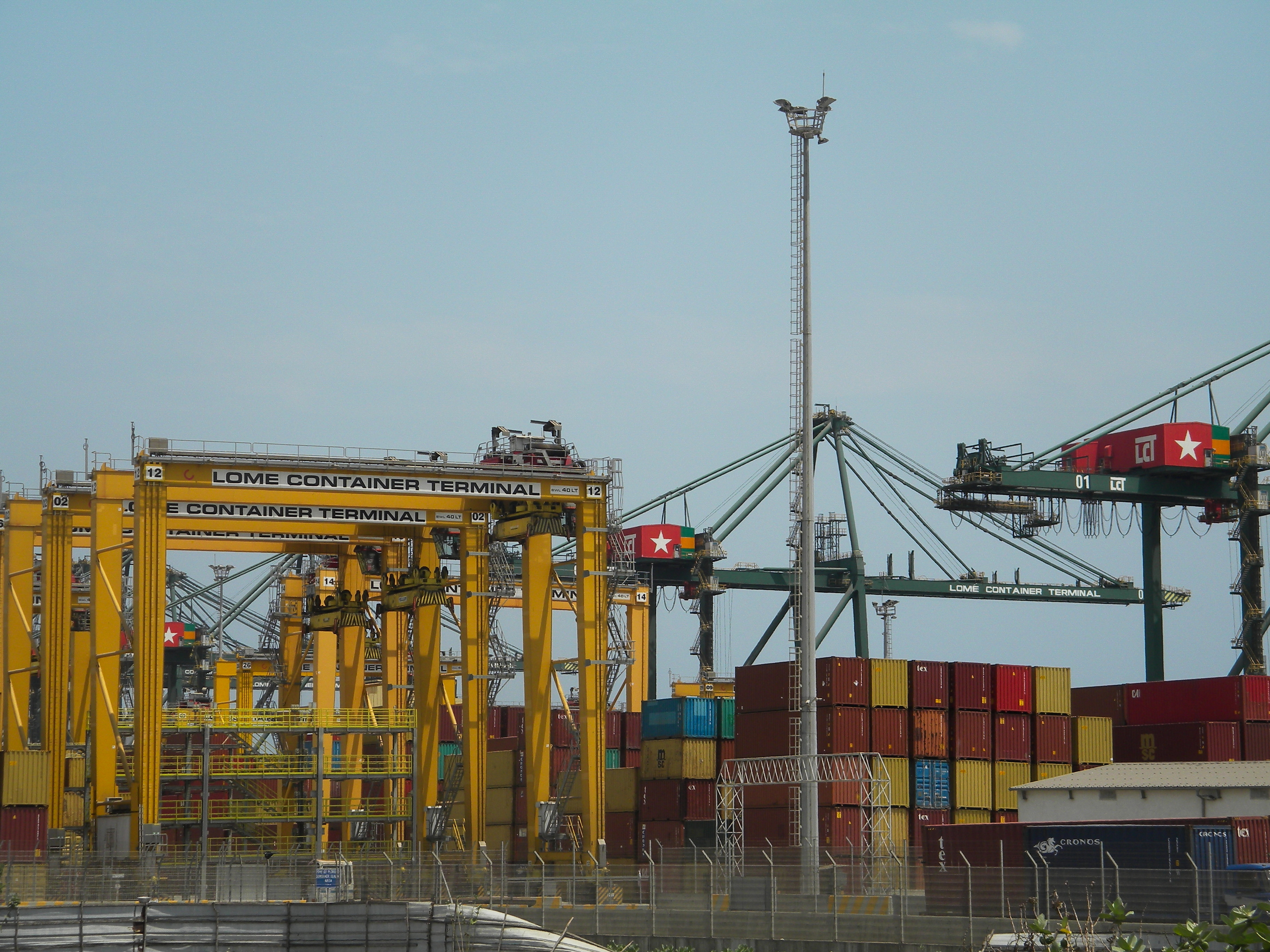
Port of Lomé

Togo, in terms of water transport, is only 50 km (31 mi) navigable, mostly seasonally on the Mono River, depending on rainfall, as of 2011. Togo has only one large container port for carrying trade operations in and out of the country, the Port of Lomé, in the capital.

=== Telecommunication ===
Togo's telecommunications has expanded and the country has emerged as one of the leading nations for mobile internet quality in the West Africa. As of early 2024, approximately 6.91 million cellular mobile connections were active in Togo, equivalent to 75.7% of the total populations. The international Telecommunication Union (ITU) reported that active mobile broadband subscriptions reached 45.3 per 100 people in 2024, and that 59.3% of the population owned a mobile cellular telephone in the same year.

The mobile network operators are Moov Africa Togo (Maroc Telecom / Moov Africa group) and Yas Togo (formerly known ae Togocel, owned by Togo Telecom, a state enterprise).

== Demographics ==
Population
Year	Million
1950	1.4
2000	5.0
2021	8.6

The November 2010 census gave Togo a population of 6,191,155, more than double the total counted in the last census; in 2022 the Togo population was 8,680,832. That census, taken in 1981, showed the nation had a population of 2,719,567. The capital, Lomé, grew from 375,499 in 1981 to 837,437 in 2010. When the urban population of surrounding Golfe prefecture is added, the Lomé Agglomeration contained 1,477,660 residents in 2010.

Other cities in Togo according to the new census were Sokodé (95,070), Kara (94,878), Kpalimé (75,084), Atakpamé (69,261), Dapaong (58,071) and Tsévié (54,474). With an estimated population of 8,644,829 (as of 2021), Togo is the 107th largest country by population. Most of the population (65%) live in rural villages dedicated to agriculture or pastures. The population of Togo shows a stronger growth: from 1961 (the year after independence) to 2003 it quintupled.

Largest cities or towns in Togo According to the 2022 Census
Rank	Name	Region	Pop.
1	Lomé	Maritime	2,188,376
2	Kara	Kara	158,090
3	Dapaong	Savanes	117,675
4	Sokodé	Centrale	115,442
5	Atakpamé	Plateaux	98,193
6	Kpalimé	Plateaux	87,478
7	Tsévié	Maritime	76,861
8	Anié	Plateaux	61,068
9	Cinkassé	Savanes	56,830
10	Notsé	Plateaux	49,143

=== Ethnic groups ===
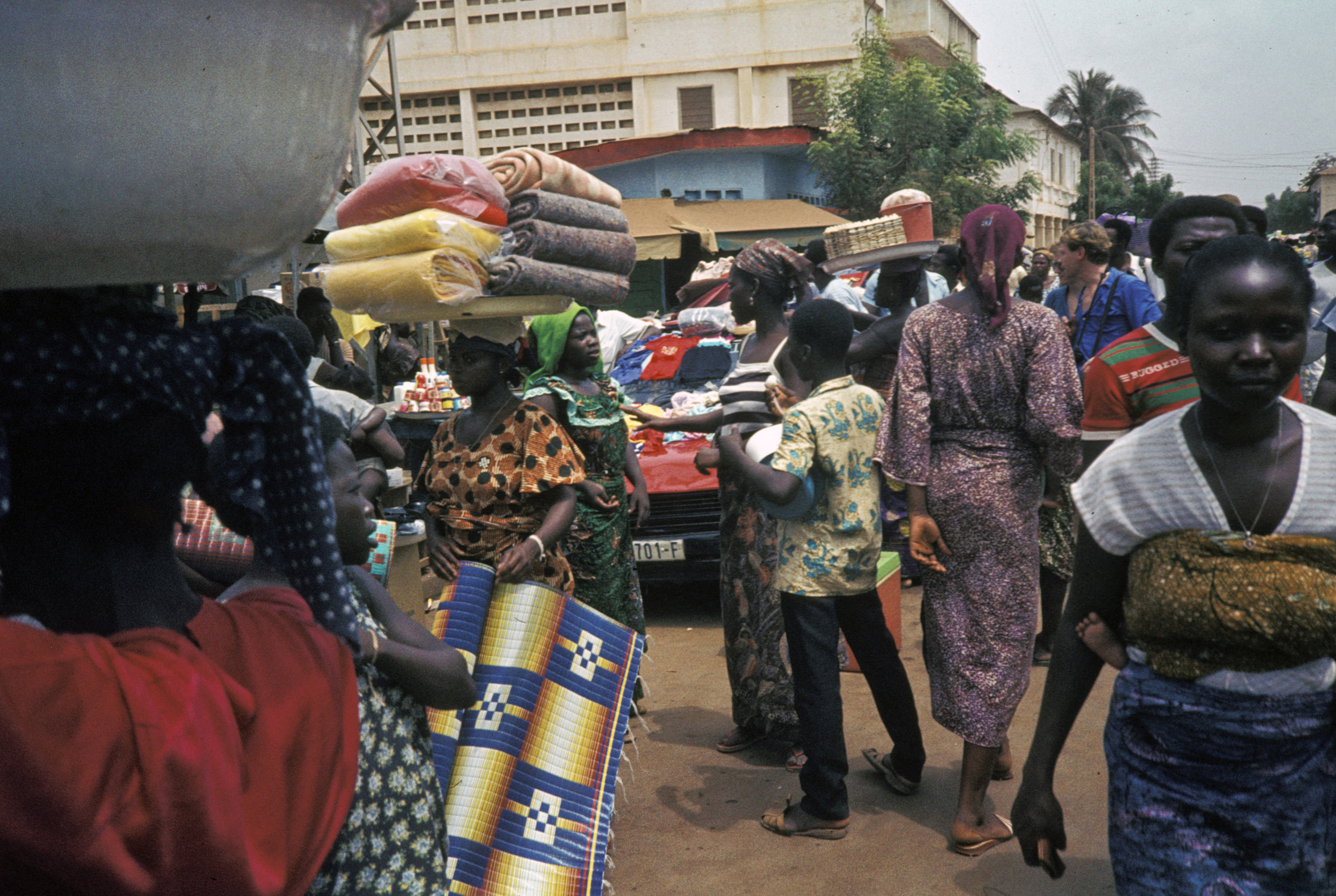
People in the 1980s

In Togo, there are about 40 different ethnic groups, the most numerous of which are the Ewe in the south, who make up 32% of the population. Along the southern coastline, they account for 21% of the population. Also found are Kotokoli or Tem and Tchamba in the centre and the Kabye people in the north (22%). The Ouatchis are 14% of the population. Sometimes the Ewes and Ouatchis are considered the same, while the French who studied both groups considered them different people. Other ethnic groups include the Mina, Mossi, the Moba and Bassar, the Tchokossi of Mango (about 8%). Non-Africans include French people and Portuguese people.

==== The Adele people ====
The Adele, who call themselves Bédéré, speak Gédéré, a language of the Gur family. Their villages number about twenty, divided between eastern Ghana and the western edge of Togo's Blitta prefecture.

According to their oral tradition, in the original village of Dibemkpa, the deity Ouroubwaré lowered four men and three women from the sky, who brought essential skills such as pottery, spinning, basketry, forging, and weaving. Over time, new migrations spread the community to Dikpéléou, site of the Nayo shrine, and then into multiple villages founded by different lineages.

Adélé settlements are known for their distinctive round, windowless houses with thatched roofs supported by external wooden posts. The village of Dibemkpa still holds numerous archaeological remains and is considered key for understanding the group's historical or mythical origins.

==== The Akebou people ====
The Akebou live in one of the plateaus of the Atakora mountains in central Togo, accessible by road from Atakpamé to Badou. Early settlement in the upper Gbankparé valley developed around independent villages, each maintaining shrines dedicated to local protective deities and affirming its autochthonous roots.

Over time, several groups joined this area. The first Ewe migrants, led by a figure named Aké or Eké, arrived in the late 18th century, settling near Lonfo and spreading into villages such as Vé and Kougnohou. A second wave of Ewe migrants in the late 19th century founded Djakpodji, which gave rise to other settlements. Additional groups included the Anyanga, who settled after conflicts in the plains, and the Ntribou, who fled Ashanti raids to find refuge in Akebou lands.

To organise these diverse communities, a central chieftaincy was established at Lonfo, creating a unique political centre in what had been an acephalous society. Lonfo's dry hilltop site and stone-walled palace, unlike the forested villages around it, symbolised a place reserved for leadership rather than everyday settlement. Oral accounts recall three successive chiefs, culminating in the reign of Akountsou, whose rule ended the system amid local resistance.

Archaeological remains of Lonfo's stone structures still stand today, and libations are made in memory of the chiefs. The plii (chief) held significant ritual authority, separate from religious sanctuaries maintained by older villages. Despite the centralised role, each group retained its distinct identity and village territory within Akébou society.

Conflicts with neighbouring Ashanti and occasional disputes with Akposso communities marked parts of Akébou history. The introduction of firearms, possibly linked to coastal trade, may have reinforced the power of Lonfo's leadership during regional conflicts.

==== The Ntrubo people ====
The Ntrubo are represented in Togo by two small villages—Diguinge and Abosomkope—located in the southern part of the Adele plateau. Most Ntrubo communities, however, live in Ghana, just west of this area.

In Togo, the Ntrubo coexist closely with the Adele, speaking both Delo, their own language, and the Adele language. Delo belongs to the Tem language group, which includes Tem (Kotokoli), Kabiye, Bago, and Lamba. This connection is linguistically puzzling because the Ntrubo are geographically isolated from other Tem speakers, suggesting that the region once formed a more continuous mountain settlement zone before later ethnic reshaping.

Local genealogies trace the Diguinge community to an ancestor named Boisa, whose descendants spread across multiple villages. Abosomkope, by contrast, traces its origins to Gounou, a neighbour of Boisa, with settlement movements linked to the early rubber trade promoted by the Germans.

Historical evidence suggests that the Ntrubo once formed part of an extensive mountain settlement area stretching from the Lamba in the north to the Adele in the south. Over time, migrations and the arrival of other groups—such as the Adele and Anyanga—have made the Ntribou a linguistic and cultural frontier at the southern edge of the Tem-speaking region.

==== The Akposso people ====
The Akposso trace their origins to two main traditions: a belief in local autochthony, especially strong in the Logbo area, and a more widespread migration narrative from Notsé, likely symbolic but possibly linked to the arrival of Ewe groups.

According to oral accounts, the ancestor Ida founded Agbogboli, a fortified hilltop site between the Logbo and Haito mountains. From there, the Akposso moved westward to Akposso-Koubi in present-day Ghana, where they reportedly resisted expansionist neighbours like the Akwamu in the 17th century. Subsequent migrations spread eastward into today's Akposso Plateau through multiple waves and lineages.

The Akposso society consists of several major groups, including the Litime, Ouwui, Ikponou, Logbo, and Ouma, each with its own villages. Linguistically, the Akposso speak Akposso, classified by early scholars in the Avatime-Bouem group. Contacts with neighbouring peoples have shaped distinct dialects: Ikposso, Logbo, and Ikpana, with additional Ewe and Ashanti influences.

Politically, traditional Akposso communities were decentralised, governed by village elders whose authority was primarily ritual. There was no overarching chiefdom until the colonial era introduced the role of awli (supreme chief). Despite this, they maintained a strong cultural cohesion through shared religious practices, notably the cult of the deity Kolissa, guardian of agricultural rites like the fonio harvest festival known today as Ovazau.

==== The Bogo (Ahlon) people ====
The Bogo (also called Ahlon) are a small group of about 6,000 people living in the valleys of Danyi, Togo, and parts of Ghana. They descend from a mix of an ancient clan, the Issassoumè, and later migrant groups possibly from Ilé-Ifè or Notsé.

Their society is structured around three main clans (Boloè, Bougli, Bonoè) plus the Issassoumè, who are recognised as the original landowners. Political power is shared: the Boloè hold the chieftaincy, the Bonoè manage regalia, and the Bougli provide warriors. The Issassoumè alone grant the sacred clay used in chief installation rituals.

Religious life centres on the Danyi River and the Odo sanctuary at Inénébia. Despite Ewe influence, the Bogo remain culturally distinct and keep their Igo language alive.

=== Religion ===
Religion in Togo (2022 census)
1. Christianity (49.2%)
2. Islam (18.6%)
3. Traditional faiths (17.0%)
4. No religion (9.40%)
5. Other/Not stated (5.80%)

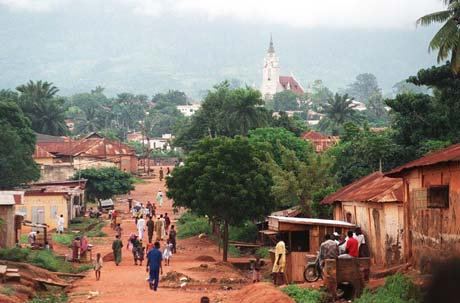
Church in Kpalime

According to a 2012 US government religious freedoms report, in 2004 the University of Lomé estimated that 33% of the population were traditional animists, 28% were Roman Catholic, 20% Sunni Muslim, 9% Protestant and another 5% belonged to other Christian denominations. The remaining 5% were reported to include persons not affiliated with any religious group. The report noted that "many" Christians and Muslims continue to perform indigenous religious practices.

In 2020, The World Factbook estimated that 42.3% of the population was Christian and 14% Muslim, with 36.9% being followers of indigenous beliefs, less than one percent being Hindus, Jews, and followers of other religions, and 6.2% being unaffiliated. The 2022 census found 49.2% of Togolese identified as Christian, 18.6% as Muslim, 17.0% as Traditionalist, 9.4% with no religion, 2.9% with other religions, and another 2.9% did not state their religious affiliation.

Christianity began to spread from the middle of the 15th century, after the arrival of Portuguese Catholic missionaries. Germans introduced Protestantism in the second half of the 19th century when a hundred missionaries of the Bremen Missionary Society were sent to the coastal areas of Togo and Ghana. Togo's Protestants were known as "Brema", a corruption of the word "Bremen". After World War I, German missionaries had to leave, which gave birth to the early autonomy of the Ewe Evangelical Church.

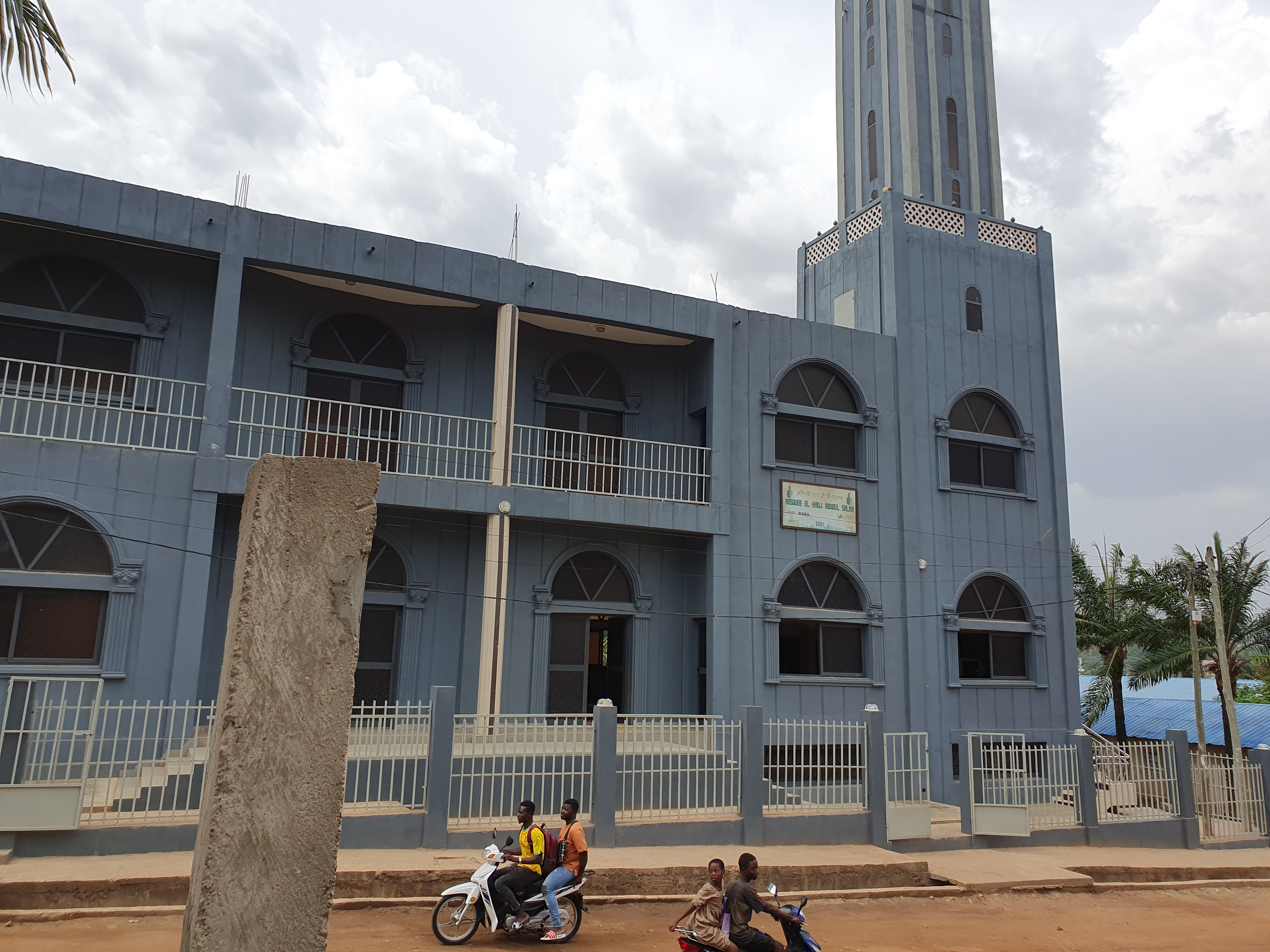
Landose de Agnanram Mosque, Kara

In 2022, Freedom House rated Togo's religious freedom as 3 out of 4, noting that religious freedom is constitutionally protected and generally respected in practice. Islam, Catholicism and Protestantism are recognized by the state; other groups must register as religious associations to receive similar benefits. The registration process has been subject to long delays with almost 900 applications pending at the beginning of 2021.

=== Languages ===
According to Ethnologue, 39 distinct languages are spoken in the country, some of them by communities that number fewer than 100,000 members. Of the 39 languages, the sole official language is French. Two spoken indigenous languages were designated politically as national languages in 1975: Ewé (Ewe: Èʋegbe; French: Evé) and Kabiyé.

Though not native to most groups, French is used in formal education, legislature, all forms of media, administration and commerce. Ewe is a language of wider communication in the south. Tem functions to a limited extent as a trade language in some northern towns. Officially, Ewe and Kabiye are "national languages", which in the Togolese context means languages that are promoted in formal education and used in the media. Others are Gen, Aja, Moba, Ntcham, and Ife. In joining the Commonwealth, the Togolese government has anticipated opportunities for Togolese citizens to learn English.

=== Health ===
The Human Rights Measurement Initiative finds that Togo is meeting 73.1% of its health human rights target, based on its level of income. When looking at the right to health with respect to children, Togo achieves 93.8% of what is expected based on its current income. In regards to the right to health amongst the adult population, the country achieves 88.2% of what is expected based on the nation's level of income. It falls into the "very bad" category when evaluating the right to reproductive health because the nation is fulfilling 37.3% of what the nation is expected to achieve based on the resources (income) it has available.

Health expenditure in Togo was 5.2% of GDP in 2014, which ranks the country in 45th place in the world. The infant mortality rate is approximately 43.7 deaths per 1,000 children in 2016. Male life expectancy at birth was at 62.3 in 2016, whereas it was at 67.7 years for females. There were 5 physicians per 100,000 people in 2008 According to a 2013 UNICEF report, 4% of women in Togo have undergone female genital mutilation.

As of 2015, the maternal mortality rate per 100,000 births for Togo is 368, compared with 350 in 2010 and 539.7 in 1990. The under 5 mortality rate per 1,000 births is 100, and the neonatal mortality as a percentage of under 5's mortality is 32. In Togo the number of midwives per 1,000 live births is 2 and the lifetime risk of death for pregnant women is 1 in 67.

In 2016, Togo had 4100 (2400–6100) new HIV infections and 5100 (3100–7700) AIDS-related deaths. There were 100,000 (73,000-130,000) people living with HIV in 2016, among whom 51% (37-67%) were accessing antiretroviral therapy. Among pregnant women living with HIV, 86% (59% - >95%) were accessing treatment or prophylaxis to prevent transmission of HIV to their children. An estimated <1000 (<500-1400) children were newly infected with HIV due to mother-to-child transmission. Among people living with HIV, approximately 42% (30-55%) had suppressed viral loads.

AFD is working to enhance living conditions in Lomé, the coastal city with a population of 1.4 million, by modernising solid waste management services. The project involves enhancing garbage collection through the construction of a new landfill that meets international standards.

In 2024, a Universal Health Insurance programme was launched, covering 800,000 people within six months and implemented through the National Social Security Fund and the National Health Insurance Institute.

=== Education ===
Education in Togo is compulsory for six years. In 1996, the gross primary enrolment rate was 119.6%, and the net primary enrolment rate was 81.3%. In 2011, the net enrolment rate was 94%. The education system has "suffered from teacher shortages, lower educational quality in rural areas, and high repetition and dropout rates".

== Culture ==
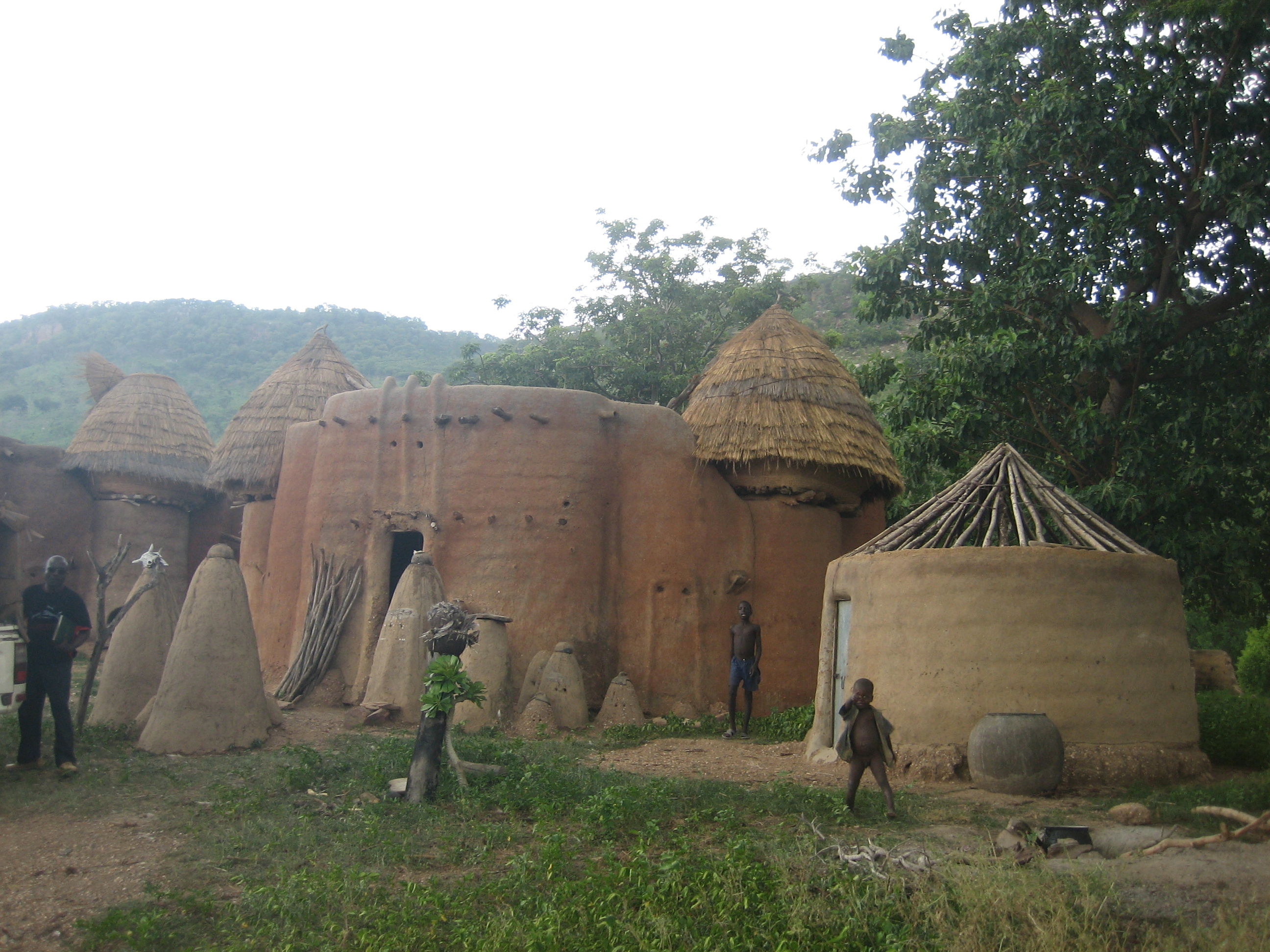
Taberma houses

Togo's cultural life reflects traditions of its major groups: Ewe/Mina in the south and Kabye/Tem in the north, notably the regional use of Ewe and Kabiye as widely spoken languages, Ewe-Mina religious practices centred on the creator god Mawu and associated vodun, and among the Kabye the Evala wrestling initiation rite, while the Guin community (linked historically to the Mina on the southeast coast) marks the new year with the Epé-Ekpé "taking of the stone" ceremony at Glidji.

Among Ewe communities, twin statuettes known as venavi (and hohovi among the Fon) venerate and memorialise twins; the Yoruba counterpart is the ère ìbejì (ibeji). In the Kloto/Kpalimé carving tradition, artisans are noted for "marriage chains" linking two figures with rings carved from a single block of wood.Picture

Weaving traditions are also prominent in Togo (e.g., the Bafilo weaving centre), with ceremonial garments produced by local artisans. Beyond weaving, wax-print cloth (pagne) is central to dress and social life in Togo: Togolese women traders, known as Nana Benz, shaped the design and circulation of these textiles, which function as valued attire for ceremonies and markers of taste and status in colonial and postcolonial contexts.

Basketball is Togo's "second most practiced sport". Togo featured a national team in beach volleyball that competed at the 2018–2020 CAVB Beach Volleyball Continental Cup in the men's section.

Mass media in Togo includes radio, television, and online and print formats. The Agence Togolaise de Presse news agency began in 1975. The Union des Journalistes Independants du Togo press association is headquartered in Lomé. Togolese Television is the state-owned service.

== See also ==
- List of Togolese people
- Outline of Togo
- Horses in Togo
- Dahomey Gap
