= Abdoulaye Faunal Reserve =

Protected area in Togo

- IUCN category IV (habitat/species management area)
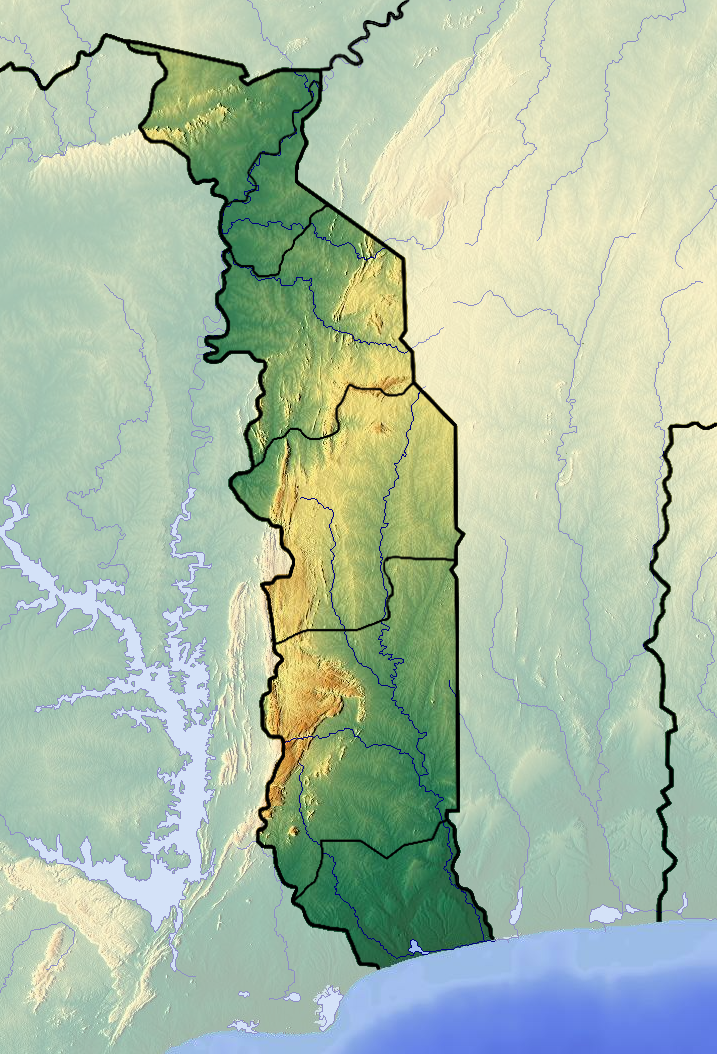
- Location within Togo
- Interactive map of Abdoulaye Faunal Reserve
- Location: Centrale, Togo
- Nearest city: Koussountou
- Coordinates: 8°41′28″N 1°20′24″E
- Area: 300 km^{2} (120 sq mi)
- Established: 1951

The Abdoulaye Faunal Reserve is a protected area located in Togo. It was established in 1951. The fauna reserve covers 300 km^{2} (120 sq mi).
