= Dapaong =

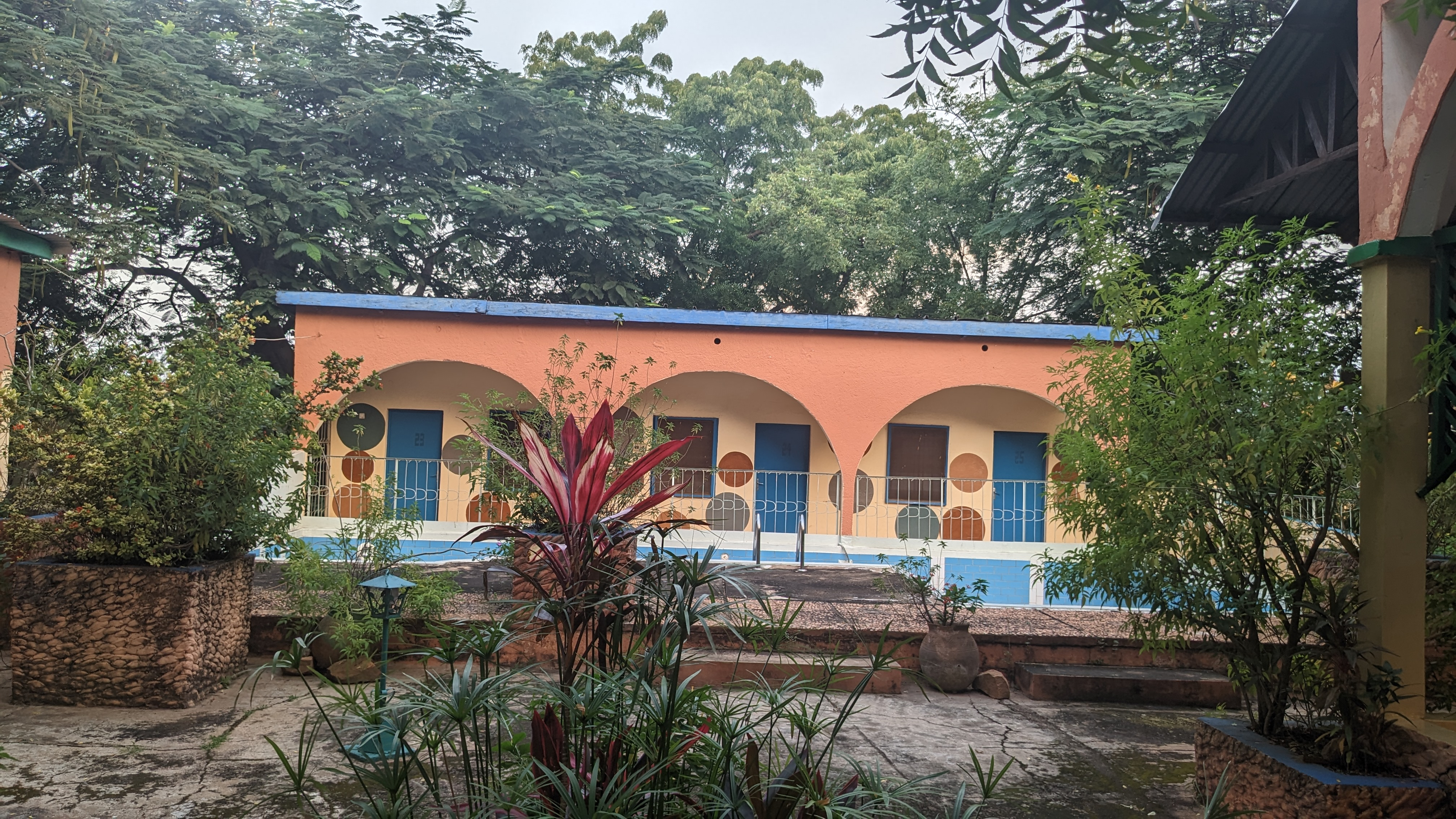
- Former German colonial encampment in Dapaong.
- Interactive map of Dapaong
- Location in Togo
- Coordinates: 10°52′04″N 0°12′13″E
- Country: Togo
- Region: Savanes
- Prefecture: Tône
- Elevation: 1,004 ft (306 m)

Population (2010)
  - Total: 58,071
- Time zone: UTC+0 (GMT)

Dapaong (also known as Dapaongo or Dapango) is a city in northern Togo and prefecture seat of Tône in the Savanes Region, of which it is the capital. It had a population of 58,071 at the 2010 Census. It is 638 km (396 mi) north of the capital Lomé, near the border with Burkina Faso. It is a market town and has a small museum.

== Economy ==
Dapaong plays a strategic role in the trade of West Africa because it occupies a privileged place for the transit of goods to Burkina Faso, Benin and Niger. The local economy is therefore one of the most important in Togo. The economic center of the city is the market with various shops which sell fabric, millet and sheep. The main sources of income are from craft manufacturing, trade and livestock, and agriculture (including cotton, millet, corn, tomato (dry season or against-season) and jatropha cultivation. Since the 2000s, the tomato cultivation has intensified around Dapaong exporting to Lome a significant amount of its production.

== Sports ==
Foadam Dapaong is a Togolese football club based in Dapaong. They play in the two division in Togolese football, the Togolese Championnat League 2.

== Infrastructure ==
Supplied with electricity from the Akosombo Dam, the city however faces major difficulties in water sanitation and public health.

== Education ==
Dapaong has several public schools, including the High School, Nassablé. The authorities of Togo support students and gave them the opportunity to learn how to use computers after giving them 20 computers.

== Demographics ==
Dapaong is populated predominantly by Moba, Gourma, Mossi and Fulani. The Roman Catholic Diocese of Dapaong is located in the city.

== Climate ==
Dapaong has a tropical savanna climate (Aw) according to the Köppen climate classification.

Climate data for Dapaong (1991–2020)
Month	Jan	Feb	Mar	Apr	May	Jun	Jul	Aug	Sep	Oct	Nov	Dec	Year
Mean daily maximum °C (°F)	33.8 (92.8)	36.2 (97.2)	36.8 (98.2)	37.3 (99.1)	34.7 (94.5)	31.7 (89.1)	30.0 (86.0)	29.1 (84.4)	30.3 (86.5)	31.6 (88.9)	35.6 (96.1)	34.4 (93.9)	33.5 (92.3)
Daily mean °C (°F)	27.2 (81.0)	29.7 (85.5)	31.8 (89.2)	31.6 (88.9)	29.7 (85.5)	27.3 (81.1)	26.2 (79.2)	25.5 (77.9)	25.9 (78.6)	27.7 (81.9)	29.0 (84.2)	27.8 (82.0)	28.3 (82.9)
Mean daily minimum °C (°F)	20.7 (69.3)	23.3 (73.9)	26.0 (78.8)	25.9 (78.6)	24.6 (76.3)	23.0 (73.4)	22.2 (72.0)	21.8 (71.2)	21.6 (70.9)	22.3 (72.1)	22.5 (72.5)	21.2 (70.2)	22.9 (73.2)
Average precipitation mm (inches)	0.0 (0.0)	5.3 (0.21)	13.7 (0.54)	64.7 (2.55)	111.0 (4.37)	151.8 (5.98)	201.3 (7.93)	265.4 (10.45)	199.2 (7.84)	75.6 (2.98)	4.4 (0.17)	0.0 (0.0)	1,092.4 (43.01)
Average precipitation days (≥ 1.0 mm)	0.1	0.6	1.5	5.3	8.5	11.1	14.6	16.9	15.1	7.9	0.6	0.0	82.2
Source: NOAA

== Notable people ==
- Djené Dakonam, footballer
- Adamou Kampatib Kankpe-Kombath, member of the Togolese Parliament, UNESCO Permanent Secretary, Director of the Togolese Office for the Education of Adults, member of the Dyiob moba clan, he died in 1985 in a tragic car accident. He was made nominated as a MONO knight (Chevalier de l'Ordre du Mono) and received the NOMA Prize from Unesco.

== See also ==
- Foadam Dapaong
