= Tem people =

Ethnic group in West Africa

Tem
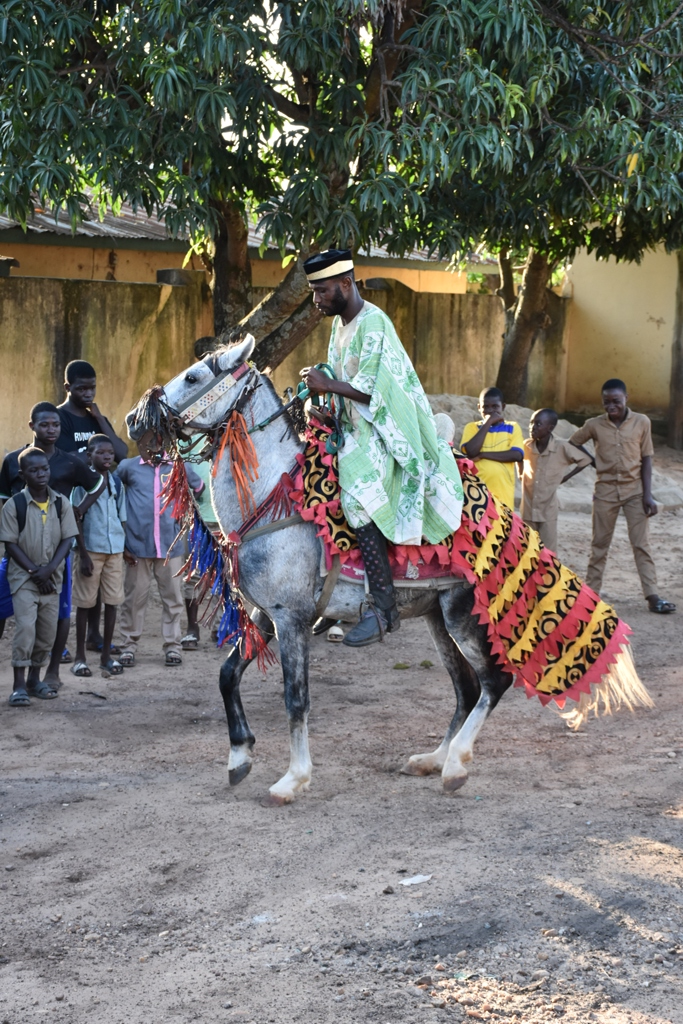
- Tem Cavalier in Sokodé, Togo.

Total population
- 417 000

Regions with significant populations
- Togo: 339 000
- Ghana: 60 000
- Benin: 18 000

Languages
- Tem, French

Religion
- Islam (Sunni)

The Tem (also known as the Temba or Kotokoliare) an ethnic group of West Africa, mainly living in Togo, Benin, Burkina Faso, and Ghana. There is reported to be about 417,000 of the Tem, with 339,000 in Togo, 60,000 in Ghana and 18,000 in Benin. They speak the Tem language.

== Ethnology ==
The Tem are referred to by a number of terms: Chaucho, Cotocoli, Cotokol, Kiamba, Kotokoli, Kotokolis, Kotokol, Temba, Tems, Timn, Tim, and Timu. Historically, they were also referred to as lions (gouni), named after the local area "Lion Forest" (Gounilawou).

== History ==
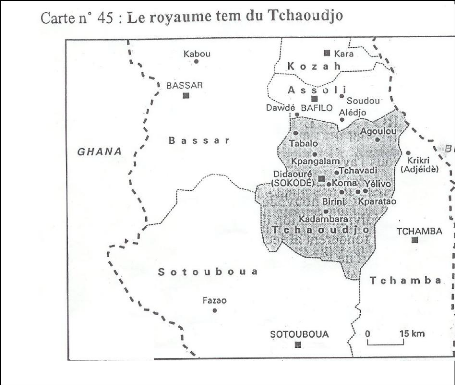
Map of the Tchaoudjo Kingdom in modern northern Togo

Little is known about the history of the Tem before the colonisation period. The Tem originated as a coalition of Gurma chiefdoms who settled around Sokodé during the 17th or 18th century, founding the Tchaoudjo Kingdom. The Tem originated in Burkina Faso, settling along the White Volta before most migrated to Togo and Benin. Over several centuries, many people groups such as the Hausa, Yoruba, and Mandinka have integrated into the Tem people group.

The Tem converted to Islam during the 19th century via the influence of Chakosi merchants. The majority of Tem profess Islam today, and have the highest percentage to do so in Togo.

== Festivals ==
The Tem people are known for performing the famous "fire dance festival", during which performers dance with fire, and are able to bring fire in contact with their skin seemingly without being hurt. Some also appear to consume the flames. It is thought by some that resistance to fire was built up by the people group out of necessity - fires are common in such a dry climate, water is not plentiful, and their houses are often made of flammable materials.

The festival begins by preparing a bonfire to the sound of drums. Performers begin as children and practice during the festivals, which are held several times per year. At the end of the festival, the fire is put out with bare feet.

== Language ==
The Tem language is a Gur language belonging to the Niger-Congo language family. The language is currently spoken by over 300,000. French is also sometimes used.

== Literature ==
Tem literature predominantly consists of tales passed down orally. Several compilations of these tales have been created, notably that of Silvano Galli, who, in the 2000s, compiled stories of approximately 100 authors and translated them into French and Italian.

Tales are told at festive assemblies, attended by renowned storytellers such as Seybou Sebabe Giafago and Aboulaye Djibirila. Traditionally, once the story is over, the audience thanks the storyteller by saying in unison "You and the Sky", to which the storyteller responds "You and the Earth". Tem literature is known across Togo, Benin, and even throughout West Africa.

Many tales feature characters of domestic or savage animals who go on various adventures reflecting human society.

== Bibliography ==
- Roger (Yaovi) Adjeoda, Ordre politique et rituels thérapeutiques chez les Tem du Togo, L’Harmattan, Paris; Montréal; Budapest, 2000, 293 p. (ISBN 2-7384-9760-8) (texte remanié d’une thèse soutenue à l’Université de Paris 8 en 1995)
- Jean-Claude Barbier, L'histoire présente, exemple du royaume Kotokoli au Togo, Centre d'étude d'Afrique noire, Institut d'études politiques de Bordeaux, 1983, 72 p.
- Mamah Fousseni, La culture traditionnelle et la littérature orale des Tem, Steiner, Stuttgart, 1984, 336 p. (ISBN 3515043837) (d’après une thèse à l’Université de Francfort-sur-le-Main, 1981)
- Mamah Fousséni, Contes tem, Nouvelles Éditions Africaines, Lomé, 1988, 108 p. (ISBN 2723609553)
- Suzanne Lallemand, Adoption et mariage : les Kotokoli du centre du Togo, L'Harmattan, 1994, 287 p. (ISBN 9782738426918)
- Suzanne Lallemand, La mangeuse d'âmes, sorcellerie et famille en Afrique, L'Harmattan, 1988, 187 p.
- Zakari Tchagbale, Suzanne Lallemand,Toi et le ciel, vous et la terre : contes paillards tem du Togo, Société d'études linguistiques et anthropologiques de France : Agence de coopération culturelle et technique, Paris, 1982, 235 p. (ISBN 285297066X)
