= Tem language =

West African language in Togo, Ghana and Benin

Tem
- Kotokoli
- Tem (Latin script) تًم (Ajami script)
- Region: Togo, Ghana, Benin, Burkina Faso
- Ethnicity: Tem people
- Native speakers: 390,000 (2012–2018)
- Language family: Niger–Congo?: Atlantic–Congo; Gur; Southern; Gurunsi; Eastern; Tem
- Writing system: Latin (Tem alphabet); Tem Braille; Arabic (former)

Official status
- Recognised minority language in: Benin

Language codes
- ISO 639-3: kdh
- Glottolog: temm1241

Tem, or Kotokoli (Cotocoli), is a Gur language spoken in Togo, Ghana, Benin and Burkina Faso. It is used by neighboring people. In Ghana the Kotokoli people come from the northern part of the Volta Region, primarily Koue along the border with Togo.

Besides their traditional home in Koue, the Tem/Kotokoli people are scattered all over Ghanaian communities. They mainly live in Zongo settlements in communities like Nima-Mamobi, Madina, Dodowa, Asaman, Jamasi, Aboaso, Mamponteng, Ahwiaa, Offinso Asamankama, Kokoti, Fanteakwa, Kinyako, Fianko, Ahamansu, Kadjebi, Hohoe, Nkwanta, Kpassa, Karachi, Dambai and a host of others. The Chieftain is called the Wuro and is the overlord of the Koue lands, the Kotokoli people, at home and in the diaspora. His name is Wuro Dauda Cheddere Brenae I. Some notable Kotokoli tribesmen include the National Youth Chief of Kotokoli, Wuro Alhaj Ismael Bameiyin, Wuro Alhaj Salifu Haruna of Madina, Sheikh Salis Shaban, Sheikh Muhammad Qassim Kpakpaturu of Jamasi, Mallam Abdul Muhaimin of Kumasi, the assembly member of Tunsuom Electoral area at Jamasi, Basharu Zakaria Kooli, the Member of Parliament for Ayawaso East, Naser Toure Mahama, the former Black Stars goalkeeper Fatau Dauda, the former DCE of Fanteakwa district Abass Fuseini Sbaabe, Alhaj Great Anyass, and the list continues. Most Kotokolis are Muslims, with a large base in Ahlul-Sunna wal Jamaa, Tijaniyya and Shia as well. Most mosques around Zongo communities have Tem Imams, Muazin/Ledeni, or tutors/Mallams, making them a notable tribe in the affairs of Islam.

== Writing system ==
Tem is currently primarily written in Latin. However historically, like other African languages spoken by primarily Muslim ethnicities, it has had a long tradition of being written in the Ajami script as well.

=== Latin Script ===
High tone is indicated by an acute accent: á é ɛ́ í ɩ́ ó ɔ́ ú ʊ́, no accent indicates low tone. Long vowels are indicated by doubling the letter: aa ee ɛɛ ii ɩɩ oo ɔɔ uu ʊʊ, both are accented if the tone is high: (áá etc.), only the first is accented if the tone is descending (áa), only the second is accented if the tone is ascending (aá).

Alphabet
Uppercase	A	B	C	D	Ɖ	E	Ɛ	F	G	Gb	H	I	Ɩ	J	K	Kp	L	M	N	Ny	Ŋ	Ŋm	O	Ɔ	P	R	S	T	U	Ʊ	V	W	Y	Z
Lowercase	a	b	c	d	ɖ	e	ɛ	f	g	gb	h	i	ɩ	j	k	kp	l	m	n	ny	ŋ	ŋm	o	ɔ	p	r	s	t	u	ʊ	v	w	y	z

=== Ajami Script ===
The Ajami script of Tem language has been standardized; the notations have been organized in primers and educational material; the digital input and typing of letters and diacritics thought and instructed. The Tem Ajami script is a unique and fascinating adaption of the Arabic alphabet, as all the 9 vowels of Tem, their short and long variants, as well as the two tones are indicated systematically in Tem Ajami script. However, unlike other Ajami tradition, Tem Ajami diverges quite a lot, where a lot of existing Arabic diacritics (as well as the letter «ث») are repurposed for phonetic representations quite different from the original Arabic script.

Tem Ajami alphabet
Arabic (Latin) [IPA]	ا ‌( - / ’ / A a ) [∅]/[ʔ]/[aː]	ب ‌(B b) [b]	پ ‌(P p) [p]	ت ‌(T t) [t]	ث ‌(Ny ny) [ɲ]	ث ‌(S s) [s]
Arabic (Latin) [IPA]	ج ‌(J j) [d͡ʒ]	چ ‌(C c) [t͡ʃ]	ح ‌(h) [h]	خ ‌(Kh kh) [h]([x])	د ‌(Ɖ ɖ) [ɖ]	ذ ‌(Z z) [z]
Arabic (Latin) [IPA]	ر (R r) [r]	ز ‌(Z z) [z]	س ‌(S s) [s]	ش ‌(Sh sh) [ʃ]‍	ص ‌(S s) [s]	ض ‌(D d) [d]
Arabic (Latin) [IPA]	ط ‌(T t) [t]	ظ ‌(Z z) [z]	ع ‌(- / ’ ) [∅]/[ʔ]	غ ‌(G g) [ɡ]	ۼ ‌(Gb gb) [ɡ͡b]	ف ‌(F f) [f]
Arabic (Latin) [IPA]	ڢ ‌(V v) [v]	ق ‌(K k) [k]	ك ‌(K k) [k]	ڮ ‌(Kp kp) [k͡p]	ل ‌(L l) [l]	م ‌(M m) [m]
Arabic (Latin) [IPA]	ن ‌(N n) [n]	ڹ ‌(Ŋ ŋ) [ŋ]	ڼ ‌(Ŋm ŋm) [ŋ͡m]	ه ‌( - / H h) [h]/[ʔ]	و ‌(W w) [w]	ی ‌(Y y) [j]
Arabic (Latin) [IPA]	ء / ؤ / ئ ‌( - / ’ ) [∅]/[ʔ]					

In Tem language, there are 9 vowels (a, e, ɛ, i, ɩ, o, ɔ, u, ʊ). These vowels are shown with either a single the three Arabic diacritics (a, i, u), a double diacritic (a modification of the meaning of double diacritic from standard Arabic orthography, where it means nunation), and an additional use of the Arabic Empty Centre Low Stop (U+06EA) character.

Furthermore, in Tem Ajami script, vowels are also distinguished by length, which in Latin are shown by doubling of the letter (aa ee ɛɛ ii ɩɩ oo ɔɔ uu ʊʊ), are written by the addition of mater lectionis letters (the letters alif, waw, and ya).

Additionally, the equivalent of acute accent, used in Latin to indicate high tone (on both short and long vowels), falling tone (on long vowels), or rising tole (on long vowels) is indicated in Tem Ajami by utlizing Arabic Small High Madda (U+06E4), used the same way as the accute accent, where the "mater lectionis" plays a role in the placement and interpretation too.

Short vowels (low tone)
	a	e	ɛ	i	ɩ	o	ɔ	u	ʊ
Word initial	اَ	اً	اً۪	اِ	اِ۪	اٌ	اٌ۪	اُ	اُ۪
Template	◌َ	◌ً	◌ً۪	◌ِ	◌ِ۪	◌ٌ	◌ٌ۪	◌ُ	◌ُ۪
Sample (with letter b «ب»)	بَ	بً	بً۪	بِ	بِ۪	بٌ	بٌ۪	بُ	بُ۪

Short vowels (high tone)
	á	é	ɛ́	í	ɩ́	ó	ɔ́	ú	ʊ́
Word initial	اَۤ	اًۤ	اً۪ۤ	اِۤ	اِ۪ۤ	اٌۤ	اٌ۪ۤ	اُۤ	اُ۪ۤ
Template	◌َۤ	◌ًۤ	◌ً۪ۤ	◌ِۤ	◌ِ۪ۤ	◌ٌۤ	◌ٌ۪ۤ	◌ُۤ	◌ُ۪ۤ
Sample (with letter b «ب»)	بَۤ	بًۤ	بً۪ۤ	بِۤ	بِ۪ۤ	بٌۤ	بٌ۪ۤ	بُ	بُ۪

Long vowels (low tone)
	aa	ee	ɛɛ	ii	ɩɩ	oo	ɔɔ	uu	ʊʊ
Word initial	-	اًي	اً۪ي	اِي	اِ۪ي	اٌو	اٌ۪و	اُو	اُ۪و
Template	◌َـا	◌ًـي	◌ً۪ـي	◌ِـي	◌ِ۪ـي	◌ٌـو	◌ٌ۪ـو	◌ُـو	◌ُ۪ـو
Sample (with letter b «ب»)	بَا	بًي	بً۪ي	بِي	بِ۪ي	بٌو	بٌ۪و	بُو	بُ۪و

Long vowels (high tone)
	áá	éé	ɛ́ɛ́	íí	ɩ́ɩ́	óó	ɔ́ɔ́	úú	ʊ́ʊ́
Word initial	آ	اًۤيۤ	اً۪ۤيۤ	اِۤيۤ	اِ۪ۤيۤ	اٌۤوۤ	اٌ۪ۤوۤ	اُۤوۤ	اُ۪ۤوۤ
Template	◌َۤـاۤ	◌ًۤـيۤ	◌ً۪ۤـيۤ	◌ِۤـيۤ	◌ِ۪ۤـيۤ	◌ٌۤـوۤ	◌ٌ۪ۤـوۤ	◌ُۤـوۤ	◌ُ۪ۤـوۤ
Sample (with letter b «ب»)	بَۤاۤ	بًۤيۤ	بً۪ۤيۤ	بِۤيۤ	بِ۪ۤيۤ	بٌۤوۤ	بٌ۪ۤوۤ	بُۤوۤ	بُ۪ۤوۤ

Long vowels (falling tone)
	áa	ée	ɛ́ɛ	íi	ɩ́ɩ	óo	ɔ́ɔ	úu	ʊ́ʊ
Word initial	-	اًۤي	اً۪ۤي	اِۤي	اِ۪ۤي	اٌۤو	اٌ۪ۤو	اُۤو	اُ۪ۤو
Template	◌َۤـا	◌ًۤـي	◌ً۪ۤـي	◌ِۤـي	◌ِ۪ۤـي	◌ٌۤـو	◌ٌ۪ۤـو	◌ُۤـو	◌ُ۪ۤـو
Sample (with letter b «ب»)	بَۤا	بًۤي	بً۪ۤي	بِۤي	بِ۪ۤي	بٌۤو	بٌ۪ۤو	بُۤو	بُ۪ۤو

Long vowels (rising tone)
	aá	eé	ɛɛ́	ií	ɩɩ́	oó	ɔɔ́	uú	ʊʊ́
Word initial	-	اًيۤ	اً۪يۤ	اِيۤ	اِ۪يۤ	اٌوۤ	اٌ۪وۤ	اُوۤ	اُ۪وۤ
Template	◌َـاۤ	◌ًـيۤ	◌ً۪ـيۤ	◌ِـيۤ	◌ِ۪ـيۤ	◌ٌـوۤ	◌ٌ۪ـوۤ	◌ُـوۤ	◌ُ۪ـوۤ
Sample (with letter b «ب»)	بَاۤ	بًيۤ	بً۪يۤ	بِيۤ	بِ۪يۤ	بٌوۤ	بٌ۪وۤ	بُوۤ	بُ۪وۤ

=== Sample Text ===
Below is a sample text in both Latin and Ajami scripts.

English Translation	Just like at the mosque (jingirí), people also pray at home and read the Quran as well as various supplications. Muslims love going to the mosque early in the morning to worship GOD (ISƆ́Ɔ) inside the mosque, because the blessings there are much greater than anywhere else.
Latin Alphabet	Jingíri kɛ́ɛ cówú ɖɩdáárɛ ɖʊɖɔ gɛ bánlám alkʊr-áánɩ na tɩlɩ́ɩwá ndɩndɩ. Malʊ́wan-nɩ sɔɔlɛ́ɛ jingirí boɖé ɖoomiŋ́ ISƆ́Ɔ sɛ́ɛ́dɩ́ jingirí-daá ndɛ́ɛ́ laaɖá wɔɔɖɔ́ɔ bɩkɩ́lɩ báa le gɛ nyɛ́ɛ́zɛ́ɛ.
Arabic Alphabet	جِنغِرِࣤ كً۪ࣤي چٌࣤوُࣤ دِ۪ضَࣤاࣤر۪ دُ۪دٌ۪ غً۪، بَࣤنلَࣤم القُ۪رُ۪آنِ۪ نَنِ۪لِ۪ࣤيوَࣤ نضِ۪نضِ۪. مَلُ۪ࣤوَننِ۪ࣤ سٌࣤولًࣤي جِنغِرِࣤ بٌدًࣤ دٌومِڹࣤ اٍ۪صٌ۪ࣤو سً۪ࣤيࣤضِ۪ࣤ جِنغِرِࣤ ضَاࣤ نض۪ࣤيࣤ لَادَࣤ وٌ۪ودٌ۪و بِ۪كِ۪ࣤلِ۪ بَࣤالًغً۪ ثً۪يࣤزً۪ي.
