= Geography of Togo =

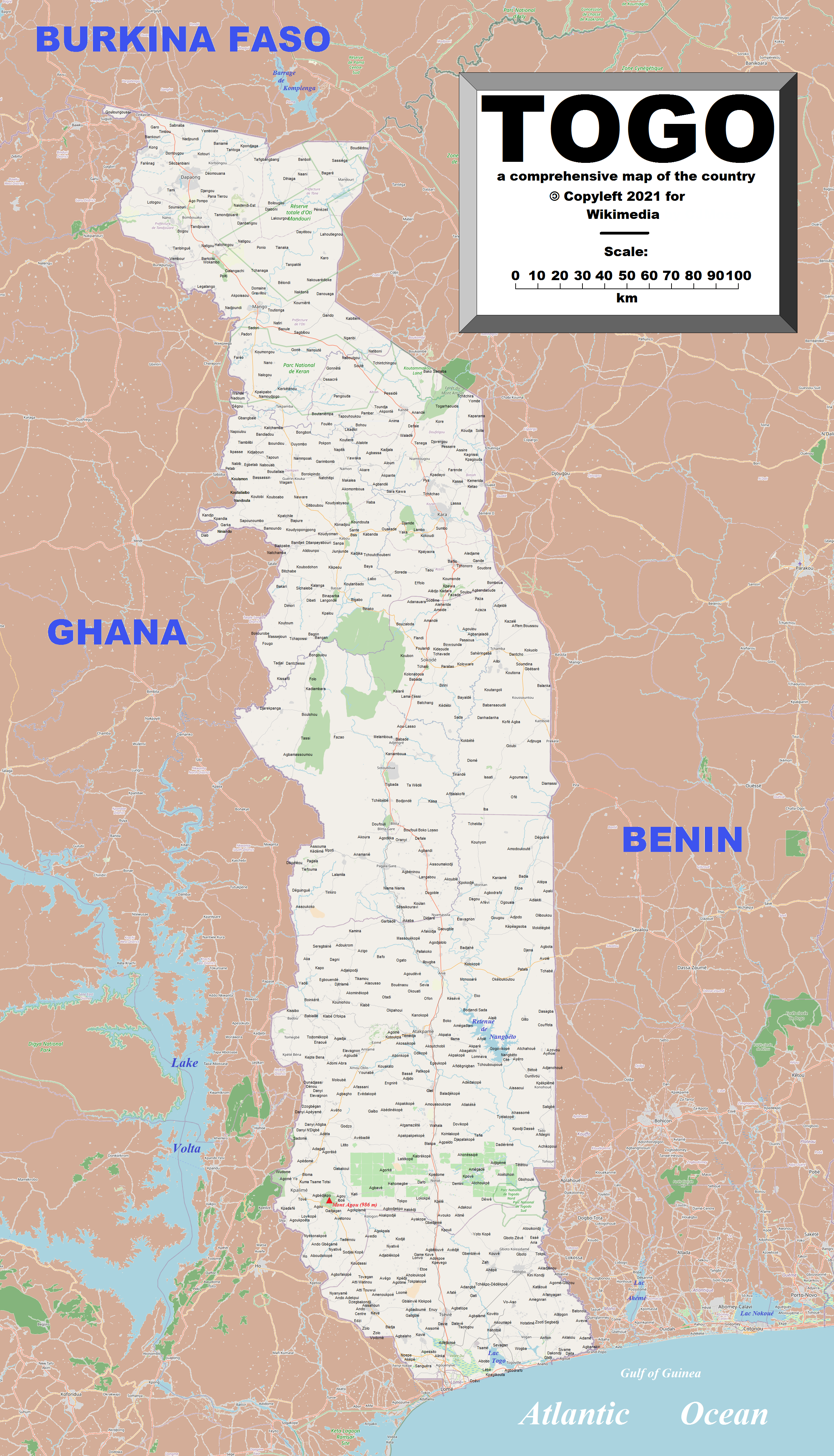
Map of Togo

Location of Togo

Togo is a small Sub-Saharan state, comprising a long strip of land in West Africa. Togo's geographic coordinates are a latitude of 8° north and a longitude of 1°10′ east. It is bordered by three countries: Benin to the east, with 644 km (400 mi) of border; Burkina Faso to the north, with 126 km (78 mi) of border; and Ghana, with 877 km (545 mi) of border. To the south Togo has 56 km (35 mi) of coastline along the Bight of Benin of the Gulf of Guinea in the North Atlantic Ocean. Togo stretches 579 km (360 mi) north from the Gulf and is only 160 km (99 mi) wide at the broadest point. In total, Togo has an area of 56,785 km^{2} (21,925 sq mi), of which 54,385 km^{2} (20,998 sq mi) is land and 2,400 km^{2} (927 sq mi) is water.

Togo is commonly divided into six geographic regions. In the south are low-lying sandy beaches. The coastal region is narrow and followed by tidal flats and shallow lagoons. There are also over 200 lakes, the largest of which is Lake Togo.

== Area statistics ==
Area
- Total: 56,785 km²
  - country rank in the world: 123rd
- Land: 54,390 km²
- Water: 2,400 km²

Area comparative
- Australia comparative: approximately 5/6 the size of Tasmania
- Canada comparative: approximately equal in size to Nova Scotia
- United Kingdom comparative: approximately four times the size of Northern Ireland
- United States comparative: approximately 1/10 smaller than West Virginia
- EU comparative: approximately equal in size to Croatia

== Land use ==
- Natural resources: phosphates, limestone, marble, arable land
- Land use:
  - arable land: 44.2%
  - permanent crops: 3.7%
  - other: 52.1% (2011)
- Irrigated land: 73 km^{2} (2003)
- Total renewable water resources: 14.7 km^{2}
- Natural hazards: hot, dry Harmattan wind can reduce visibility in north during winter; periodic droughts.

== Physical geography ==
The country consists primarily of two savanna plains regions separated by a southwest–northeast range of hills (the Chaîne du Togo). In the north lies the Ouatchi Plateau. This plateau is about 30 kilometres (19 mi) wide and located at an altitude of 60 to 90 metres (197 to 295 ft) above sea level. Terre de Barre is another name for this region, in use because of the reddish leached soil which is rich in iron. This southern area of Togo has been categorised by the World Wildlife Fund as part of the Guinean forest-savanna mosaic ecoregion.

Northeast of the Ouatchi Plateau lies a tableland. At its highest this region is about 500 metres (1,640 ft) above sea level. The area is drained by the Mono River and its tributaries, including the Ogou River.

To the west and the southwest of the tableland lie the Togo Mountains. These mountains run across the central region of Togo, ranging from the southwest to the northeast. The mountain range reaches into Benin where it is known as the Atakora Mountains and Ghana where it is known as the Akwapim Hills. The highest mountain in Togo is Mount Agou with a height of 986 metres (3,235 ft).

North of the Togo Mountains lies a sandstone plateau through which the Oti River flows. The vegetation is characterized by savanna. The River Oti which drains the plateau is one of the main tributaries of the River Volta.

In the far northwest of Togo lies a higher region which is characterized by its rocks: granite and gneiss. The cliffs of Dapaong (Dapango) are located in this part of Togo.

Map of Togo. The five Regions of Togo span its climatic zones from the coastal equatorial climate of the south to the tropical savanna at the north. Data for Lomé, Sokodé and Mango are shown in the climate tables
Population Map of Togo's five regions.

Total Togo population (wikidata:Q945) = 7,797,694 (2017)
(WD = Wikidata page)

[Hide/Show list of regions]
	Togo	pop.
1	Centrale Region, Togo	795,529^{WD}
2	Kara Region	985,512^{WD}
3	Maritime Region, Togo	2,599,955^{WD}
4	Plateaux Region, Togo	1,635,946^{WD}
5	Savanes Region, Togo	1,143,520^{WD}

== Climate ==
Almost all of Togo has a tropical savanna climate (Köppen Aw). Average temperatures ranging from 27.5 °C (81.5 °F) on the coast to about 30 °C (86 °F) in the northernmost regions. There is a dry season between November and March dominated by the desert winds of the Harmattan, which bring less humid and less unpleasant weather. To the south there are two seasons of rain, the first between April and July and the second weaker rainy season between September and November. In this region rainfall is much lower than in the rest of southern West Africa due to divergent coast-parallel winds between mid-July and mid-September creating a short, foggy secondary dry season.

Climate data for Lomé (Lomé Airport) 1961-1990, extremes 1892-present
Month	Jan	Feb	Mar	Apr	May	Jun	Jul	Aug	Sep	Oct	Nov	Dec	Year
Record high °C (°F)	35.7 (96.3)	36.4 (97.5)	36.3 (97.3)	35.0 (95.0)	34.8 (94.6)	36.4 (97.5)	32.8 (91.0)	36.5 (97.7)	35.5 (95.9)	33.8 (92.8)	38.1 (100.6)	34.5 (94.1)	38.1 (100.6)
Mean daily maximum °C (°F)	31.7 (89.1)	32.3 (90.1)	32.5 (90.5)	32.1 (89.8)	31.3 (88.3)	29.6 (85.3)	28.2 (82.8)	28.0 (82.4)	29.1 (84.4)	30.4 (86.7)	31.6 (88.9)	31.6 (88.9)	30.7 (87.3)
Daily mean °C (°F)	27.1 (80.8)	28.2 (82.8)	28.5 (83.3)	28.2 (82.8)	27.4 (81.3)	26.2 (79.2)	25.3 (77.5)	25.2 (77.4)	25.8 (78.4)	26.6 (79.9)	27.3 (81.1)	27.1 (80.8)	26.9 (80.4)
Mean daily minimum °C (°F)	22.5 (72.5)	24.0 (75.2)	24.5 (76.1)	24.4 (75.9)	23.5 (74.3)	22.8 (73.0)	22.5 (72.5)	22.3 (72.1)	22.5 (72.5)	22.8 (73.0)	22.9 (73.2)	22.5 (72.5)	23.1 (73.6)
Record low °C (°F)	15.2 (59.4)	16.7 (62.1)	19.9 (67.8)	20.0 (68.0)	19.2 (66.6)	18.0 (64.4)	16.7 (62.1)	17.1 (62.8)	18.0 (64.4)	16.4 (61.5)	18.6 (65.5)	15.6 (60.1)	15.2 (59.4)
Average rainfall mm (inches)	8.9 (0.35)	23.1 (0.91)	53.4 (2.10)	96.1 (3.78)	152.7 (6.01)	251.8 (9.91)	91.0 (3.58)	32.7 (1.29)	64.7 (2.55)	74.6 (2.94)	20.4 (0.80)	7.8 (0.31)	877.2 (34.53)
Average rainy days (≥ 1.0 mm)	0	2	3	5	9	11	6	4	6	6	2	1	55
Average relative humidity (%)	79	81	82	82	84	86	87	86	86	85	84	82	84
Mean monthly sunshine hours	222.4	214.8	228.0	218.0	217.8	141.3	135.4	147.5	168.4	218.0	240.6	227.2	2,379.4
Source 1: Deutscher Wetterdienst
Source 2: NOAA (sun 1961–1990), Meteo Climat (record highs and lows)

Lomé mean sea temperature
Jan	Feb	Mar	Apr	May	Jun	Jul	Aug	Sep	Oct	Nov	Dec
28 °C (82 °F)	28 °C (82 °F)	29 °C (84 °F)	29 °C (84 °F)	29 °C (84 °F)	28 °C (82 °F)	26 °C (79 °F)	25 °C (77 °F)	25 °C (77 °F)	27 °C (81 °F)	28 °C (82 °F)	28 °C (82 °F)

Climate data for Sokodé (1961–1990, extremes 1901–present)
Month	Jan	Feb	Mar	Apr	May	Jun	Jul	Aug	Sep	Oct	Nov	Dec	Year
Record high °C (°F)	40.5 (104.9)	41.0 (105.8)	40.5 (104.9)	40.5 (104.9)	38.0 (100.4)	36.5 (97.7)	38.5 (101.3)	38.0 (100.4)	35.7 (96.3)	40.5 (104.9)	39.9 (103.8)	38.0 (100.4)	41.0 (105.8)
Mean daily maximum °C (°F)	34.1 (93.4)	35.5 (95.9)	35.4 (95.7)	33.9 (93.0)	32.3 (90.1)	30.4 (86.7)	28.9 (84.0)	28.6 (83.5)	29.7 (85.5)	31.8 (89.2)	33.7 (92.7)	33.6 (92.5)	32.3 (90.1)
Daily mean °C (°F)	26.3 (79.3)	28.0 (82.4)	28.7 (83.7)	27.9 (82.2)	26.7 (80.1)	25.5 (77.9)	24.4 (75.9)	24.0 (75.2)	24.8 (76.6)	25.6 (78.1)	26.4 (79.5)	25.9 (78.6)	26.2 (79.2)
Mean daily minimum °C (°F)	17.6 (63.7)	19.8 (67.6)	21.8 (71.2)	22.2 (72.0)	21.7 (71.1)	21.0 (69.8)	20.7 (69.3)	20.0 (68.0)	20.4 (68.7)	20.2 (68.4)	18.1 (64.6)	17.2 (63.0)	20.1 (68.2)
Record low °C (°F)	10.0 (50.0)	11.0 (51.8)	15.8 (60.4)	18.0 (64.4)	18.0 (64.4)	16.0 (60.8)	16.0 (60.8)	16.8 (62.2)	15.5 (59.9)	16.0 (60.8)	11.0 (51.8)	10.0 (50.0)	10.0 (50.0)
Average rainfall mm (inches)	4.9 (0.19)	17.4 (0.69)	65.7 (2.59)	103.0 (4.06)	138.8 (5.46)	186.5 (7.34)	233.1 (9.18)	246.2 (9.69)	252.8 (9.95)	117.0 (4.61)	19.7 (0.78)	11.7 (0.46)	1,396.7 (54.99)
Average rainy days (≥ 1.0 mm)	0	1	5	8	11	13	16	18	16	8	1	1	97
Average relative humidity (%)	35	49	64	71	76	82	84	85	86	80	69	54	70
Mean monthly sunshine hours	262.9	243.1	235.0	214.7	220.2	174.8	124.7	110.4	135.5	213.9	250.6	256.0	2,441.8
Source 1: Deutscher Wetterdienst
Source 2: NOAA (sun 1961–1990), Meteo Climat (record highs and lows)

Climate data for Mango (Sansane-Mango) (1961–1990, extremes 1901–present)
Month	Jan	Feb	Mar	Apr	May	Jun	Jul	Aug	Sep	Oct	Nov	Dec	Year
Record high °C (°F)	40.9 (105.6)	41.9 (107.4)	44.4 (111.9)	42.1 (107.8)	41 (106)	38 (100)	36 (97)	34.2 (93.6)	34.4 (93.9)	37.2 (99.0)	39 (102)	39.6 (103.3)	44.4 (111.9)
Mean daily maximum °C (°F)	36 (97)	37.8 (100.0)	39.1 (102.4)	38 (100)	35.5 (95.9)	32.2 (90.0)	30.5 (86.9)	29.5 (85.1)	30.6 (87.1)	32.9 (91.2)	35.7 (96.3)	35.6 (96.1)	34.5 (94.1)
Daily mean °C (°F)	26.8 (80.2)	29.4 (84.9)	31.5 (88.7)	31.4 (88.5)	29.6 (85.3)	27.5 (81.5)	26.4 (79.5)	26 (79)	26.4 (79.5)	27.9 (82.2)	27.9 (82.2)	26.7 (80.1)	28.1 (82.6)
Mean daily minimum °C (°F)	18 (64)	21 (70)	24.4 (75.9)	25.3 (77.5)	24.1 (75.4)	22.5 (72.5)	21.9 (71.4)	21.9 (71.4)	21.6 (70.9)	21.7 (71.1)	19.4 (66.9)	18.1 (64.6)	21.5 (70.7)
Record low °C (°F)	12.1 (53.8)	15 (59)	18 (64)	18.2 (64.8)	18.9 (66.0)	18.8 (65.8)	18.8 (65.8)	19.5 (67.1)	17.4 (63.3)	17.8 (64.0)	14.5 (58.1)	13.8 (56.8)	12.1 (53.8)
Average rainfall mm (inches)	0.2 (0.01)	4.1 (0.16)	28.6 (1.13)	66.1 (2.60)	106.1 (4.18)	136.6 (5.38)	195.9 (7.71)	236.7 (9.32)	235.5 (9.27)	69.1 (2.72)	5.5 (0.22)	3.4 (0.13)	1,087.9 (42.83)
Average rainy days (≥ 1.0 mm)	0	1	2	4	7	10	12	14	15	6	0	0	71
Average relative humidity (%)	27	28	40	58	69	78	83	85	84	77	54	35	59
Mean monthly sunshine hours	269.7	246.4	254.2	237	251.1	216	170.5	148.8	171	257.3	273	257.3	2,737.5
Source: Deutscher Wetterdienst

== Environment ==
Current issues:

- deforestation attributable to slash-and-burn agriculture and the use of wood for fuel
- health hazards and impact on the fishing industry from water pollution
- air pollution increasing in urban areas

Togo is party to: Biodiversity, Climate Change, Climate Change-Kyoto Protocol, Desertification, Endangered Species, Law of the Sea, Ozone Layer Protection, Ship Pollution (MARPOL 73/78), Tropical Timber 83, Tropical Timber 94, Wetlands, Whaling

=== Deforestation ===
==== Tree cover extent and loss ====
Global Forest Watch publishes annual estimates of tree cover loss and 2000 tree cover extent derived from time-series analysis of Landsat satellite imagery in the Global Forest Change dataset. In this framework, tree cover refers to vegetation taller than 5 m (including natural forests and tree plantations), and tree cover loss is defined as the complete removal of tree cover canopy for a given year, regardless of cause.

For Togo, country statistics report cumulative tree cover loss of 82,074 ha (820.74 km^{2}) from 2001 to 2024 (about 14.9% of its 2000 tree cover area). For tree cover density greater than 30%, country statistics report a 2000 tree cover extent of 551,477 ha (5,514.77 km^{2}). The charts and table below display this data. In simple terms, the annual loss number is the area where tree cover disappeared in that year, and the extent number shows what remains of the 2000 tree cover baseline after subtracting cumulative loss. Forest regrowth is not included in the dataset.

Annual tree cover loss in Togo, 2001–2024. View chart definition.
Tree cover extent in 2000 minus cumulative tree cover loss in Togo, 2001–2024 (loss-only residual; does not account for gain). View chart definition.

Annual tree cover extent and loss
Year	Tree cover extent (km2) (Note: This residual measure does not include forest regrowth.)	Annual tree cover loss (km2)
2001	5,487.13	27.64
2002	5,466.95	20.18
2003	5,446.47	20.48
2004	5,418.94	27.53
2005	5,398.44	20.50
2006	5,381.58	16.86
2007	5,349.79	31.79
2008	5,338.07	11.72
2009	5,282.31	55.76
2010	5,277.20	5.11
2011	5,264.77	12.43
2012	5,247.38	17.39
2013	5,218.24	29.14
2014	5,193.11	25.13
2015	5,183.75	9.36
2016	5,149.29	34.46
2017	5,078.22	71.07
2018	5,010.60	67.62
2019	4,958.73	51.87
2020	4,904.27	54.46
2021	4,845.85	58.42
2022	4,795.82	50.03
2023	4,751.34	44.48
2024	4,694.03	57.31

==== REDD+ reference level and monitoring ====
Under the UNFCCC REDD+ framework, Togo has submitted a national forest reference level (FRL). On the UNFCCC REDD+ Web Platform, the country's 2020 submission is listed as having an assessed reference level, while a national strategy, safeguards information and a national forest monitoring system are all listed as "not reported".

The first assessed FRL, submitted in 2020 and technically assessed in 2022, covered two REDD+ activities at national scale: reducing emissions from deforestation and enhancement of forest carbon stocks through reforestation and afforestation. Using a 2003-2018 reference period, the original submission proposed 730,590 t CO2 per year, revised during the technical assessment to an assessed FRL of 729,520 t CO2 per year. The technical assessment states that the benchmark represented the annual average of net CO2 emissions and removals, and included above-ground biomass, below-ground biomass and deadwood.

== Extreme points ==
This is a list of the extreme points of Togo, the points that are farther north, south, east or west than any other location.

- Northernmost point – the tripoint with Ghana and Burkina Faso, Savanes Region
- Easternmost point – unnamed location on the border with Benin in the Mono River immediately west of the Beninese town of Grand-Popo, Maritime Region
- Southernmost point – the point at which the border with Ghana enters the Atlantic Ocean, Maritime Region
- Westernmost point - a point about 2.5 km south-southwest of the tripoint with Ghana and Burkina Faso, Savanes Region
