= Kamalo Falls =

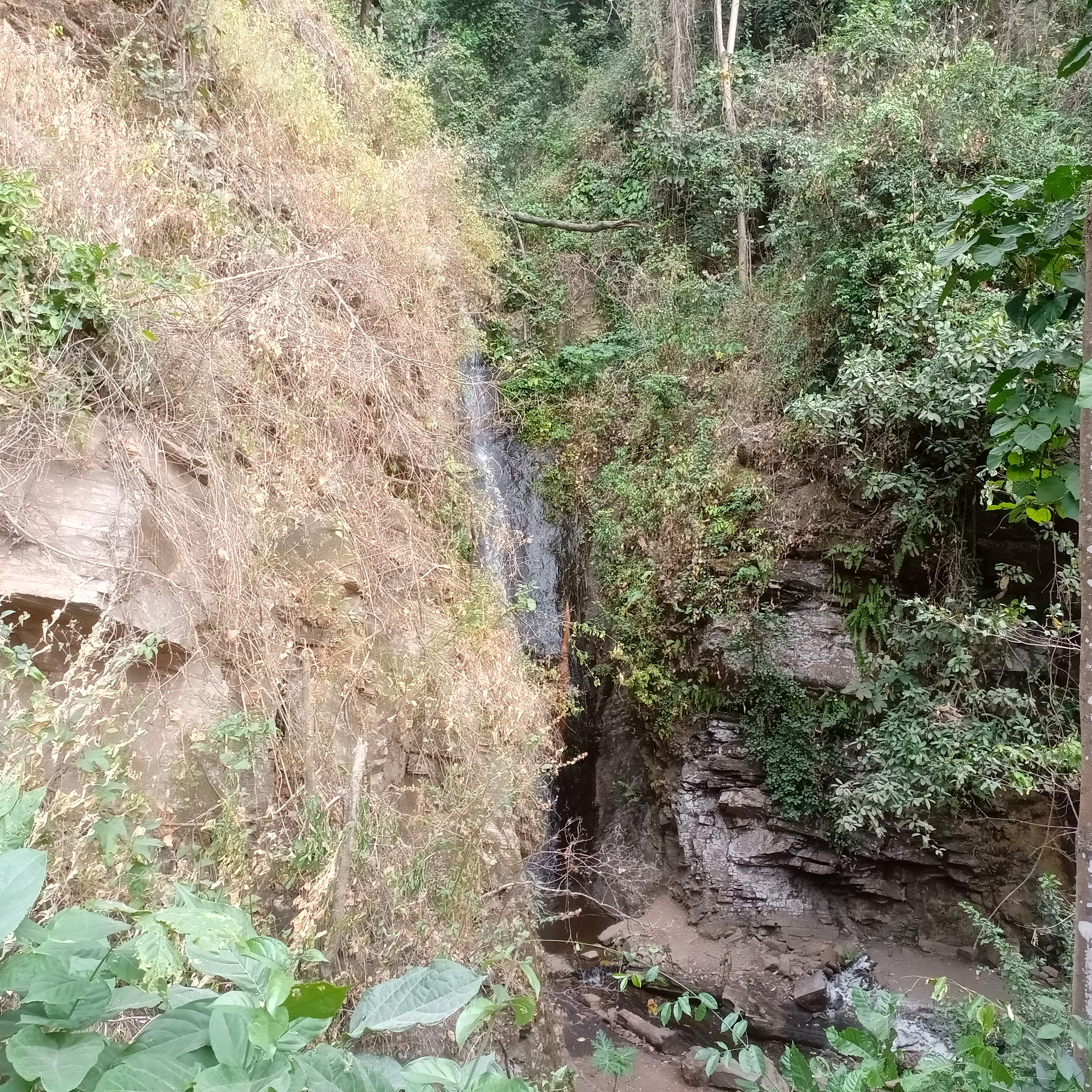
- Downstream of a part of the Falls
- Interactive map of Kamalo Falls
- Location: Togo
- Coordinates: 6°57′07″N 0°35′52″E

Kamalo Falls is a natural waterfall located near the commune of Missahoé, in the southwest of Togo, in the Kloto Prefecture and the Plateaux region. It is situated in the center of the Missahoé protected forest. It is the most visited waterfall in the country.

The waterfall originates from Mount Kloto and is fed by a stream named Kamalo, which flows through the Missahoé protected forest. The waterfall itself is located near the commune of Missahoé and the commune of Agomé-Yoh. The only mineral water company in Togo, named "Cascade", used it as a source until the early 1990s. It then opened to tourism and became the most visited waterfall in the country. This was particularly possible because it is easily accessible, as it is close to the paved road connecting Kpalimé and Kuma-Konda.
