= Agome people =

Ethnic group in Togo

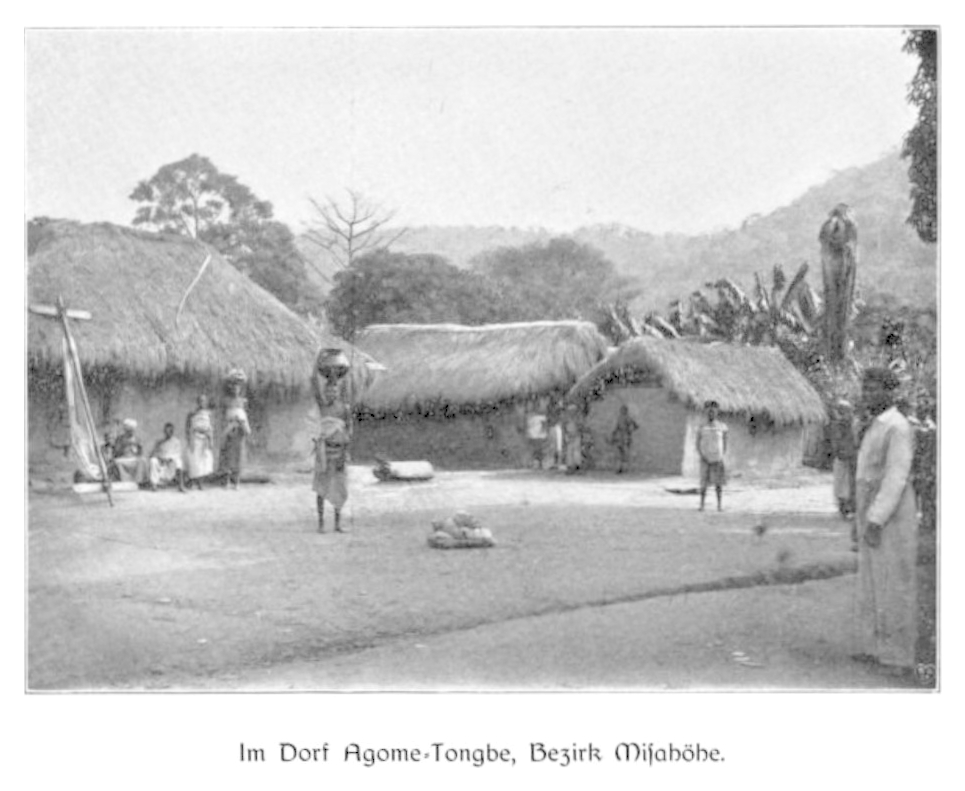
Population of Agome-Tongbe in 1904

The Agome or Agomé are a people of West Africa, primarily settled in the southwest of Togo, in the Plateaux region and the Kloto prefecture. They emerged between the 17th and 18th centuries during the exodus of the Ewe from Notsé, and are a sub-group of the Ewe people. In the 21st century, the Agomé are mainly found around the town of Kpalimé, formerly Agomé-Kpalimé.

== Onomastics ==
The origin of the name Yoh, which is sometimes attached to the term Agomé, especially for the main chieftaincy of the people in Agomé-Yoh, is unclear. It is either due to the name of trees that the first Agomé found, which were called "Yoti", or, according to Agomé oral tradition, the name of a people who preceded them in the area, who were called the "Yoh".

== History ==
=== Origins ===
The history of the Agomé is closely linked to that of the broader Ewe people, of which they are a part. The ancestors of this people settled in Notsé and founded a prosperous city-state there. However, after multiple political and social developments, some of the inhabitants rebelled against their sovereign, Agokoli, who was deemed too tyrannical, and decided to leave the city and go into exile. From this exile, the Ewe people were born, and the Agomé, who descended from them, settled in the present-day Kpalimé region, starting with Agomé-Yoh. Agomé-Yoh maintains a central place as the main chieftaincy of the people due to its antiquity, even though Kpalimé is now a more important city. Some Agomé leaders had diplomatic contacts with Western powers in the 18th and early 19th centuries.

=== Colonization ===
The people resisted German colonization, notably shooting at a German captain in 1898. One of their leaders, the chief of Agomé-Yoh, Togbui Tsally Kokou Senyo, played a significant role in the struggle for Togo's independence.

=== Post-colonial Togo ===
In the second half of the 20th century, the Agomé were mainly found in the communes of Agomé-Tomégbé, Agomé-Yoh, Agomé-Kousountou, Agomé-Kpodzi, and Kpalimé. The chief, Togbui Tsally, later became an important supporter of the Gnassingbé regime and continued his activities, such as organizing libations and ceremonies in the community.
