= Agomé-Yoh =

- human settlement
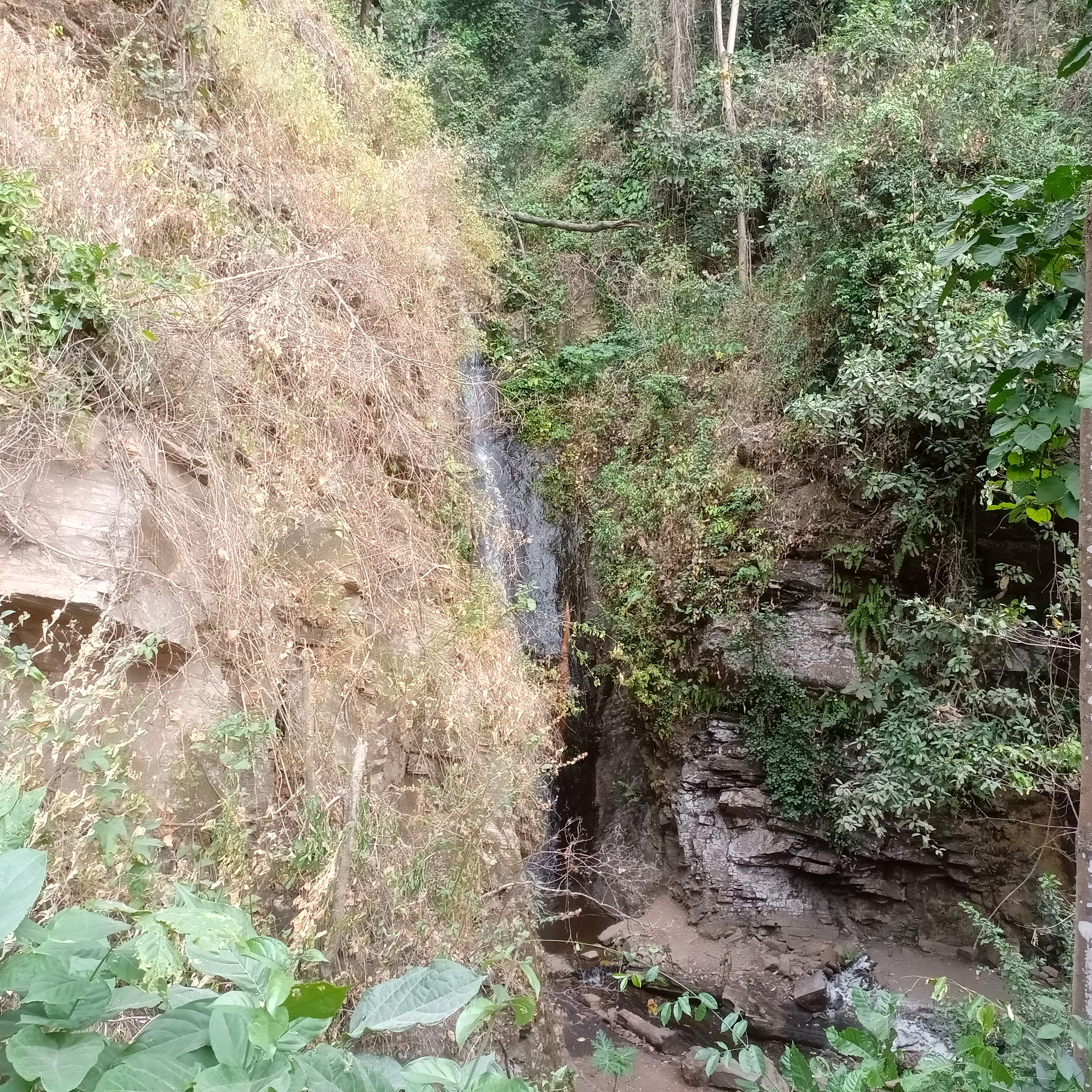
- Interactive map of Agomé-Yoh
- Coordinates: 6°56′42″N 0°35′54″E
- Country: Togo

Agomé-Yoh or Agomé-Yo is a Togolese commune in the Kloto Prefecture, in the southwest of Togo in the Plateaux region. It is situated in the center of the Missahoé protected forest, neighboring Missahoé and near Kpalimé.

The commune is close to Togo's most visited waterfall, Kamalo Falls, and remains the seat of the traditional authority of the Agomé people. Additionally, on the road leading to Missahoé, there are archaeological remains from the German colonization period.

== Toponymy ==
The place is named after the Agomé people, to which was added a variety of trees found on the site upon their arrival, the "Yoti" trees.

== History ==
=== Settlement ===
The commune is located on the land of the Agomé people, a sub-group of the Ewe people, from whom it takes its name. Before their arrival in the 18th century, the area was inhabited by the Tové Ahoundjo, who migrated after the Agomé arrived.

It is one of the five towns in Togo where the Agomé are the majority, and the first one they populated. Thus, although the nearby commune of Kpalimé, formerly Agomé-Kpalimé, became more significant from the 18th century onwards, the center of Agomé power is located there, and they retain the supreme chieftaincy of their people.

=== Colonization ===
The commune was visited and traversed by German explorers who visited the region with a view to colonization. One of the chiefs of Agomé-Yoh, Togbui Tsally Kokou Senyo, played a significant role in the struggle for Togo's independence.

=== Post-colonial Togo ===
The chief, Togbui Tsally, later became an important supporter of the Gnassingbé regime and continued his activities, such as organizing libations and ceremonies]in the community. There are still archaeological remains from the German colonization along the road connecting Agomé-Yoh to Missahoé. The commune was later incorporated into the grouping of communes "Kloto 3".

Coffee and cocoa cultivation is very widespread around the commune.

== Climate ==
In 2013, the region's rainfall varied between 1400 and 1800 mm, with 2 to 3 months of dry season each year. The maximum temperature recorded at that time was 34 degrees, and the minimum was 18 degrees.

== Hydrography ==
The commune is located near Kamalo Falls, the most visited waterfall in Togo.
