= WASP-64 =

Star in the constellation Canis Major

WASP-64 / Atakoraka
Observation data Epoch J2000.0 Equinox ICRS
- Constellation: Canis Major
- Right ascension: 06^{h} 44^{m} 27.60507^{s}
- Declination: −32° 51′ 30.1793″
- Apparent magnitude (V): 12.29

Characteristics
- Evolutionary stage: main-sequence star
- Spectral type: G7
- Apparent magnitude (J): 11.368
- Apparent magnitude (H): 11.079
- Apparent magnitude (K): 10.956

Astrometry
Radial velocity (R_{v})	34.40±1.23 km/s
Proper motion (μ)	RA: -19.265 mas/yr Dec.: -1.072 mas/yr
Parallax (π)	2.7721±0.0102 mas
Distance	1,177 ± 4 ly (361 ± 1 pc)

Details
Mass	1.004±0.028 M_{☉}
Radius	1.058±0.025 R_{☉}
Luminosity	0.95±0.13 L_{☉}
Surface gravity (log g)	4.4±0.15 cgs
Temperature	5550±150 K
Metallicity [Fe/H]	−0.08±0.11 dex
Rotation	15.8±3.7 d
Rotational velocity (v sin i)	3.4±0.8 km/s
Age	3.554±1.629 Gyr

Other designations
- A: TIC 52640301, WASP-64 A, TYC 7091-1288-1
- B: Atakoraka, TOI-473, TIC 52640302, WASP-64 B, GSC 07091-01514, 2MASS J06442760-3251302, WISE J064427.58-325130.1

Database references
SIMBAD	data
Exoplanet Archive	data

WASP-64, also named Atakoraka, is a star about 1,177 light-years away in the constellation Canis Major. It is a G7 class main-sequence star, orbited by a planet WASP-64b. It is younger than the Sun at 3.6±1.6 billion years, and it has a metal abundance similar to the Sun. The star is rotating rapidly, being spun up by the giant planet in a close orbit.

While an imaging survey in 2017 failed to find any stellar companions, a 2019 survey using Gaia DR2 data found WASP-64 to be the secondary component of a double star system, with a wide separation of 24.2 arcseconds or 9,058 AU. The primary star is designated TYC 7091-1288-1, and can also be called WASP-64 A, with the planet host being WASP-64 B. Although the stars share a similar distance and common proper motion, their relative space velocity appears to be high enough that the pair are not gravitationally bound.

== Nomenclature ==
The designation WASP-64 comes from the Wide Angle Search for Planets.

This was one of the systems selected to be named in the 2019 NameExoWorlds campaign during the 100th anniversary of the IAU, which assigned each country a star and planet to be named. This system was assigned to Togo. The approved names were Atakoraka for the star after the Atacora, the largest mountain range in Togo, and Agouto for the planet after Mount Agou, the highest mountain in Togo.

== Planetary system ==
A transiting hot Jupiter exoplanet orbiting WASP-64 was discovered by WASP in 2012. The planetary equilibrium temperature is 1672^{+59}_{−63} K, while the measured dayside temperature is hotter at 1989^{+87}_{−88} K. Due to the close proximity of the planet to the parent star, orbital decay of WASP-64b, along with HATS-2, may be detectable in the near future. WASP-64b was named Agouto (after Mount Agou, the highest point of Togo which lies within the Atacora chain) in 2019 by amateur astronomers from Togo as part of the NameExoWorlds contest.

The WASP-64 planetary system
Companion (in order from star)	Mass	Semimajor axis (AU)	Orbital period (days)	Eccentricity	Inclination (°)	Radius
b / Agouto	1.221+0.073 −0.071 M_{J}	0.02652+0.00024 −0.00025	1.5732918(15)	<0.054	86.57+0.80 −0.60	1.244±0.036 R_{J}
