= Missahoé =

- human settlement
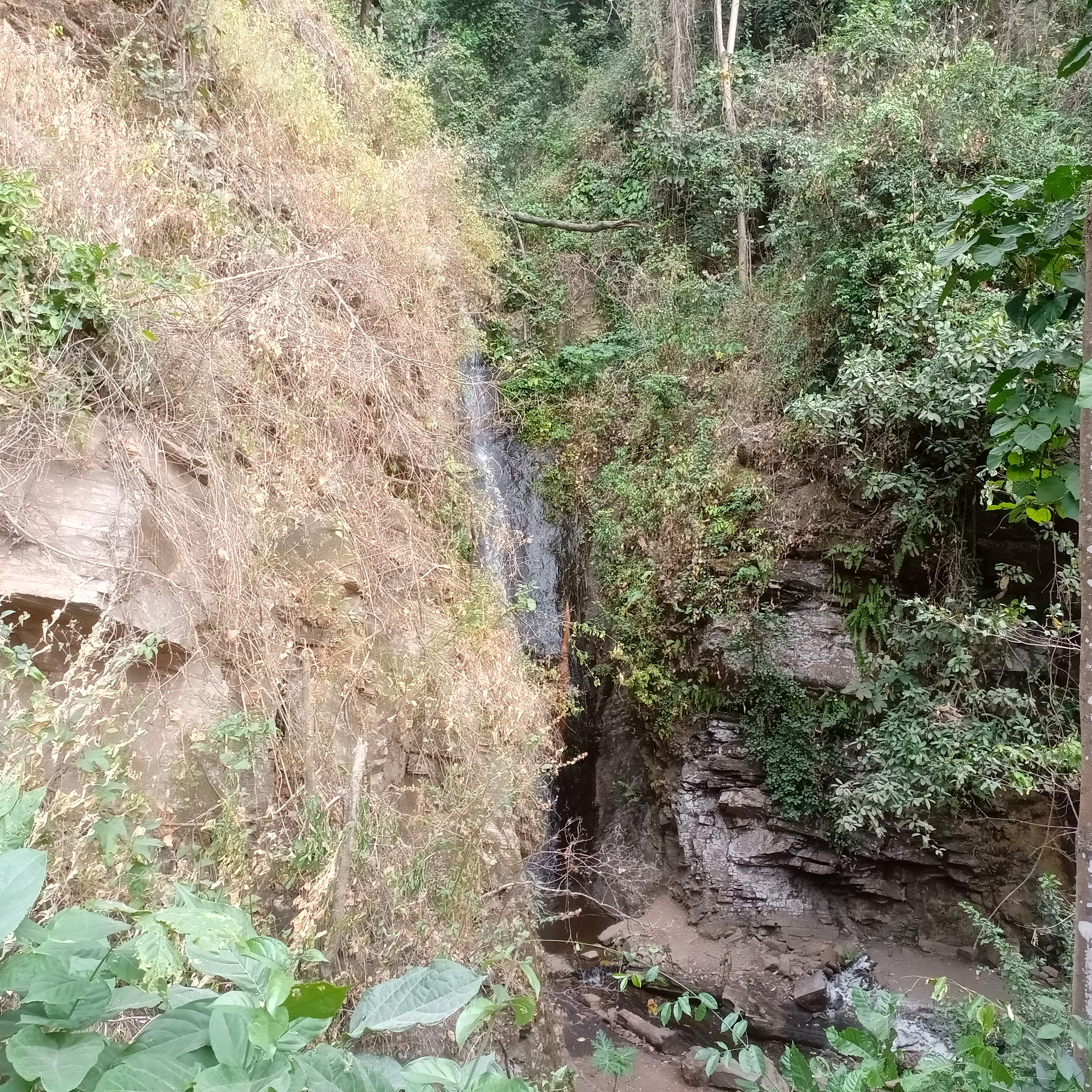
- Interactive map of Missahoé
- Coordinates: 6°56′59″N 0°35′07″E
- Country: Togo

Missahoé is a Togolese commune located in the Kloto Prefecture, in the southwestern part of Togo in the Plateaux region. It is situated in the center of the Missahoé protected forest, to which it gave its name, and near Kpalimé and Agomé-Yoh.

The commune retains some colonial remains and is close to the most visited waterfall in Togo, Kamalo Falls.

== History ==
=== Colonization ===
The small commune was named by the colonial administrator and governor of German Togoland, Jesko von Puttkamer, in 1890. It is not an endonym but an exonym, as von Puttkamer named the locality 'Misahöhe' in honor of his former lover, a Hungarian princess, Mária Esterházy von Galantha, nicknamed Misa.

It was a strategic location for the colonizers due to its high altitude and cool climate, and they made build for them the governor's house, a courthouse, a prison, and a German cemetery there. During French colonization, which succeeded German colonization, in 1934, a meteorological station was installed in the commune.

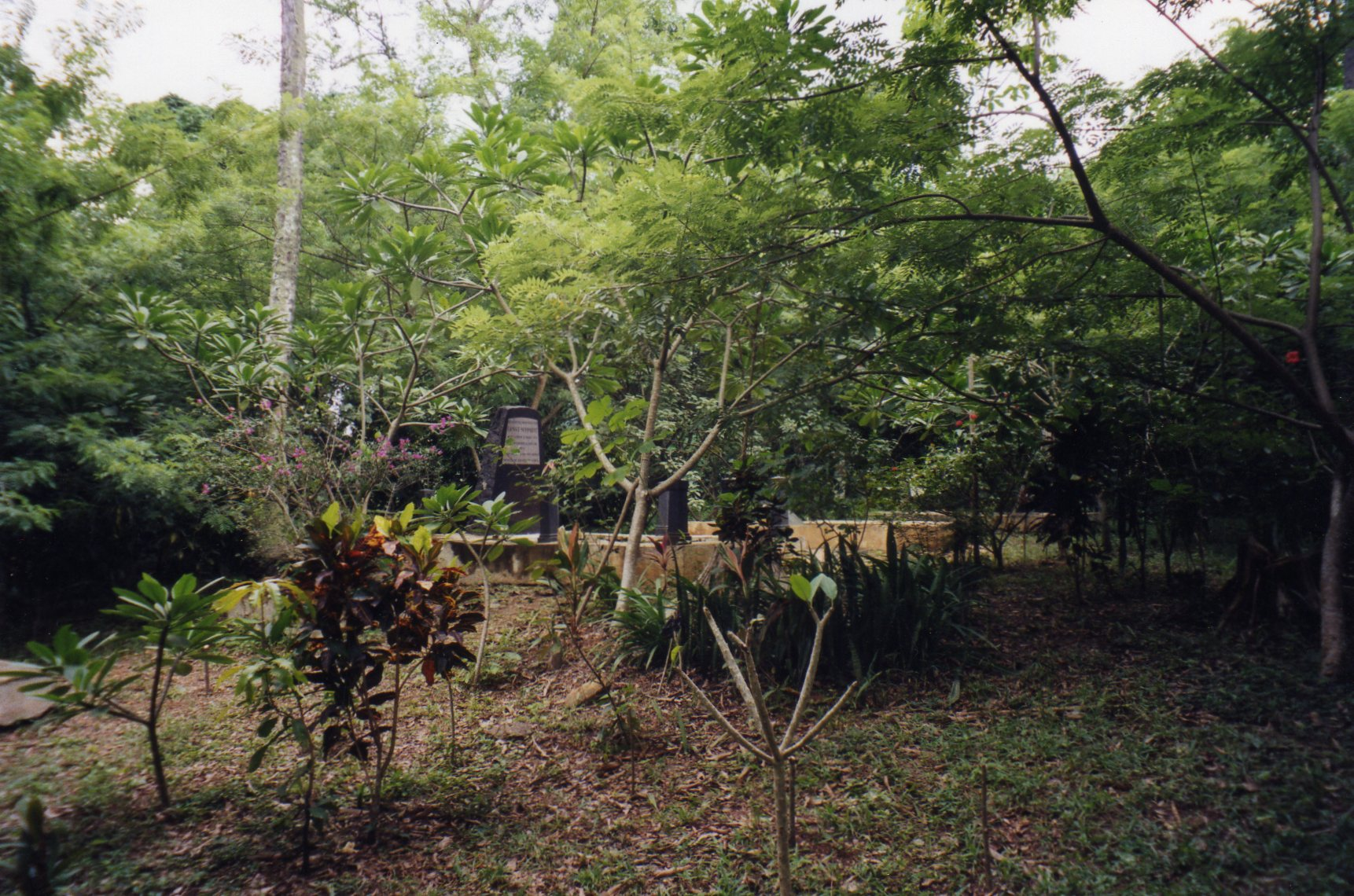
German cemetery in Missahoé

=== Post-colonial Togo ===
At the beginning of the 21st century, the majority of the population in the entire region is composed of the Ewe people, and the 11 communes surrounding the protected forest had a combined population of 25,845 inhabitants. The house of the German governor still exists in the village.

Coffee and cocoa cultivation is very widespread around the commune.

== Climate ==
In 2013 the region's rainfall varied between 1400 and 1800 mm, with 2 to 3 months of dry season each year. The maximum temperature recorded at that time was 34 degrees, and the minimum was 18 degrees.

== Hydrography ==
The commune is located near Kamalo Falls, the most visited waterfall in Togo.
