= Gentille Assih =

Togolese film director

- Born: Kpalimé
- Occupations: Film director, film producer
- Years active: 2004-present

Gentille Menguizani Assih is a Togolese film director and producer.

== Biography ==
Assih was born in Kpalimé, Togo in 1979. She developed a passion about cinema from a young age. In 2001, she trained as a technician in computer graphics and photography. In 2006, Assih studied screenwriting and documentary making with Africadoc, in Senegal. During this same period, she earned a BTS in communication from the African Institute of Commercial Studies. In 2009, Assih received a degree in Human Resources Management.

Assih worked in a communications firm for two years before establishing the company "World Films". She began her directing career in 2004, making the short films Le prix du velo and La vendeuse contaminee. In 2008, she directed her first short documentary film, Itchombi. It details the circumcision ceremony of Deou, a Togolese student who returns from Dakar.

The following year, Assih directed and produced Bidenam, l’espoir d’un village, with help from the Goethe Institute in Johannesburg. The film is about the life of Bidenam, who returns to her native village after six years and decides to teach his family how to use an irrigation system, and it touches upon themes of politics and rural exodus. It was inspired by Assih's younger sister who went to Morocco to study agronomy. In 2012, Assih directed the feature-length documentary Le Rite, la Folle et moi. In the film, she studies the initiation rite for women in northern Togo. Continuing her work on ceremonies from her previous documentary, the object of this rite is her younger sister.

In 2021, Assih was one of the recipients of the Top 25 Canadian Immigrant Awards.

== Filmography ==
- 2004: Le prix du velo
- 2004: La vendeuse contaminee
- 2008: Itchombi
- 2009: Bidenam, l’espoir d’un village
- 2012: Le Rite, la Folle et moi
