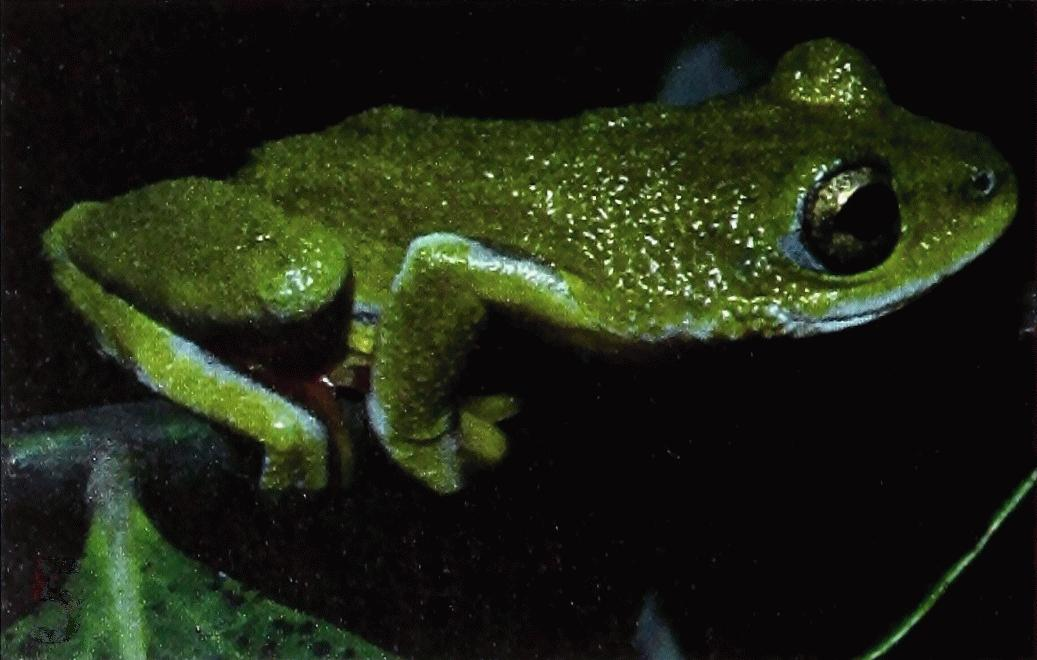

Conservation status
- Least Concern (IUCN 3.1)

Scientific classification
- Kingdom: Animalia
- Phylum: Chordata
- Class: Amphibia
- Order: Anura
- Family: Hyperoliidae
- Genus: Hyperolius
- Species: H. occidentalis

Binomial name
- Hyperolius occidentalis Schiøtz, 1967

= Hyperolius occidentalis =

Species of amphibian

Hyperolius occidentalis is a species of frog in the family Hyperoliidae. Its common name is western reed frog. It is found in the coastal lowlands of westernmost West Africa in Senegal, the Gambia, Guinea-Bissau, Guinea, and Sierra Leone.

== Description ==
Males measure 19–29 mm (0.75–1.14 in) and females 29–34 mm (1.1–1.3 in) in snout–vent length. The dorsum is green and may have a darker hourglass pattern. The toes and thighs are reddish. The pupils are horizontal. The toes and fingers have circummarginal disks. The male advertisement call is a double or triple "click". In the Bissagos Islands, the species was found in vegetation about half a meter above the ground, mostly on leaf surfaces or twigs of shrubs. During the heat of the day, they may assume a characteristic resting position to reduce water loss.

Hyperolius occidentalis is very similar to Hyperolius picturatus and the two might even be the same species, perhaps with H. occidentalis being a western subspecies of H. picturatus.

== Habitat and conservation ==
Hyperolius occidentalis lives in heavily degraded former forests (farm bush) within the forest zone, and in gallery forests within the savanna zone. It also occurs on cultivated land, such as irrigated rice fields. Breeding takes place in temporary and permanent pools.

Hyperolius occidentalis is a very common species. It is adaptable, unlikely to face any significant threats, and probably occurs in several protected areas. The International Union for Conservation of Nature (IUCN) has assessed it as of "Least Concern".
