= Château Viale =

Chateau in Togo

Coordinates: 6°56′4.58″N 0°37′24.51″E

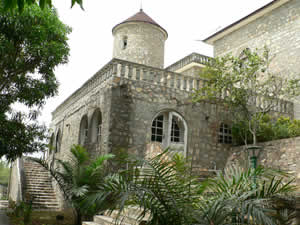

Château Viale is a chateau in the hills to the north of Kpalimé, in the Kloto Prefecture of Togo.

It was built by a German in the early 1940s and consists of a main building and a tower. The building is owned by the Togolese government and is used for cabinet meetings. It had already been used for meetings during the reign of Gnassingbé Eyadéma. Much to the displeasure of the surrounding population of Kouma-Konda, over whom a curfew was imposed when Eyédama received state guests. In the past presidents such as François Mitterrand, Félix Houphouët-Boigny and Abdou Diouf have stayed at the chateau, as well as the German CDU Chairman Franz Josef Strauss. It underwent renovation in 1979.
