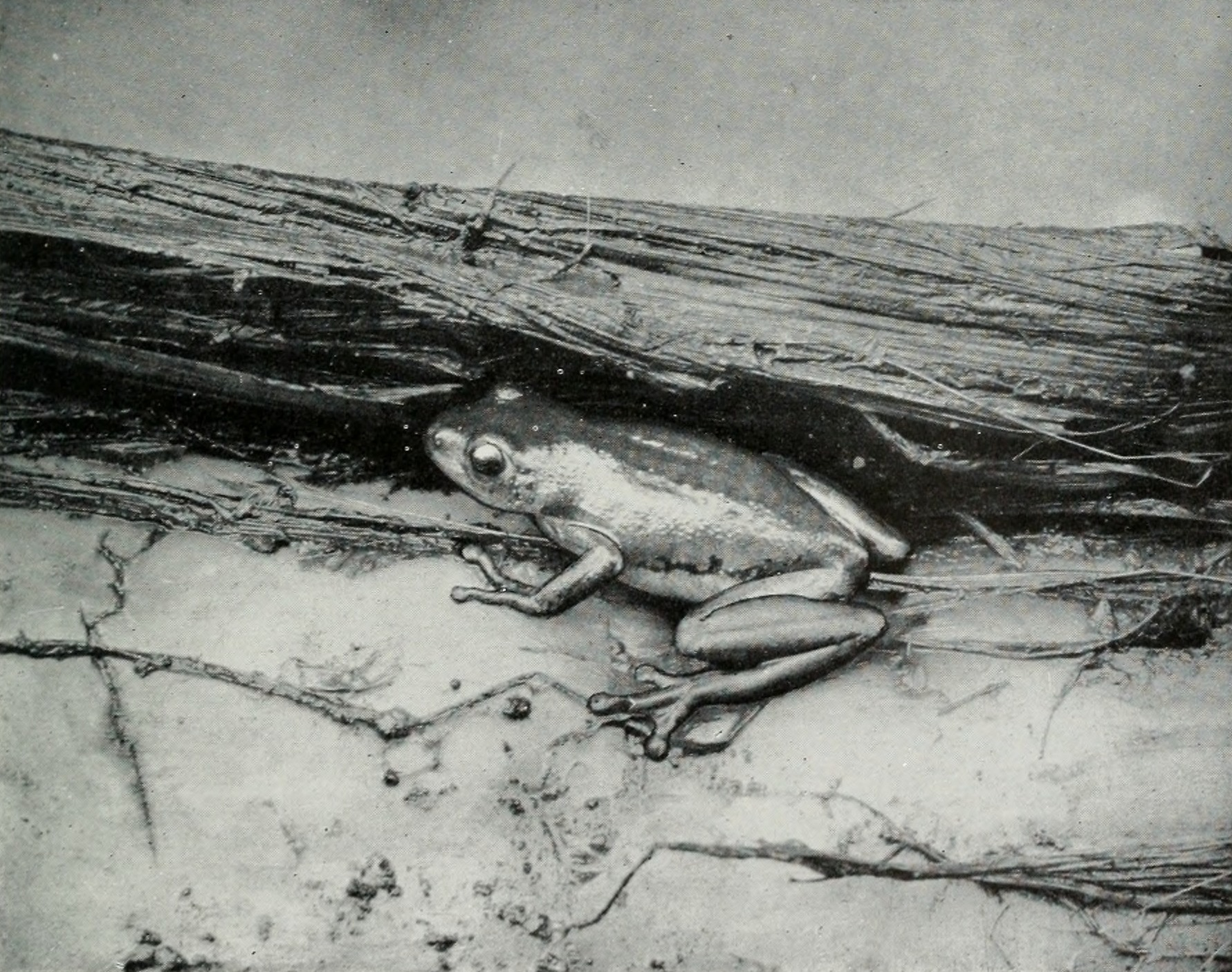

Conservation status
- Least Concern (IUCN 3.1)

Scientific classification
- Kingdom: Animalia
- Phylum: Chordata
- Class: Amphibia
- Order: Anura
- Family: Hyperoliidae
- Genus: Hyperolius
- Species: H. picturatus

Binomial name
- Hyperolius picturatus Peters, 1875

Synonyms
- Rappia picturata (Peters, 1875); Hyperolius festivus Barbour and Loveridge, 1927

= Hyperolius picturatus =

Species of frog

Hyperolius picturatus is a species of frog in the family Hyperoliidae. It is found in northern and eastern Sierra Leone, southern Guinea, Liberia, Ivory Coast, and Ghana; its range might extend to Togo. Common names coined for this species are Tanzania reed frog (although it does not occur in Tanzania) and variable montane sedge frog.

== Taxonomy ==
Hyperolius picturatus is a very variable species. It might be composed of two cryptic species that occur in sympatry; the eastern form might be conspecific with Hyperolius baumanni and the western one with Hyperolius occidentalis, possibly representing subspecies.

== Description ==
Males measure 21–31 mm (0.83–1.22 in) and females 26–34 mm (1.0–1.3 in) in snout–vent length. Males have an hourglass pattern and/or broad dorsolateral stripes. Females have a uniform dorsum and often broad, light dorsolateral stripes and dark flanks. The pupil is horizontal.

The male advertisement call consists of an initial sound followed by a series of clicks.

== Habitat and conservation ==
Hyperolius picturatus typically occur in secondary forest and forest clearings, and where plenty of tall trees remain, also in heavily degraded former forest (farm bush) and sugar cane cultivation. It is present in primary forest close to larger rivers only. Breeding takes place in flowing water, ranging from very small, slow-moving creeks to fast-flowing mountain streams. The males call well-concealed from within bushes and can be very difficult to locate.

Though usually uncommon, it can be locally common. As a somewhat adaptable species, it can be threatened by opening up of its habitat and habitat loss. It is present in many protected areas (e.g., Mont Sângbé National Park, Forêt Classée du Pic de Fon). The International Union for Conservation of Nature (IUCN) has assessed it as of "Least Concern".
