= Hyperolius baumanni =

Conservation status
- Least Concern (IUCN 3.1)

Scientific classification
- Kingdom: Animalia
- Phylum: Chordata
- Class: Amphibia
- Order: Anura
- Family: Hyperoliidae
- Genus: Hyperolius
- Species: H. baumanni

Binomial name
- Hyperolius baumanni Ahl, 1931

Species of amphibian

Hyperolius baumanni is a species of frog in the family Hyperoliidae. It is known from the Akwapim-Togo Ranges along the border between Ghana and Togo and from central Ghana. Common name Baumann's reed frog has been coined for this species.

== Etymology ==
The specific name baumanni honours Ernst Baumann, a German zoologist (1863–1895) who worked at the German research station in Misahöhe, Togo—the type locality of this species.

== Description ==
Hyperolius baumanni is a medium-sized member of its genus, with males measuring 23–30 mm (0.91–1.18 in) and females about 31 mm (1.2 in) in snout–vent length. The dorsum is almost uniformly brown and bears a broad, light dorso-lateral stripe. The pupil is horizontal. Male advertisement call consists of a slow, coarse initial sound, followed by a long, accelerating series of clicks.

Hyperolius baumanni is very similar to Hyperolius picturatus, and is possibly an eastern subspecies of the latter. However, the two have differences in morphology (larger gular flap in H. baumanni) and the advertisement call.

== Habitat and conservation ==
Hyperolius baumanni occurs in secondary forest, forest edge, and heavily degraded former forest (farm bush). Breeding is unknown but is assumed to involve attaching eggs to leaves above shallow, densely vegetated temporary ponds.

The species is extremely abundant in its small range. No significant threats to this adaptable species are known. It occurs in the Kyabobo National Park in Ghana and in a number of smaller forest reserves. Given its presumed large population and adaptability, and despite its relatively small range, it is assessed as being of "Least Concern".
