= Mount Agou =

Mountain in Togo

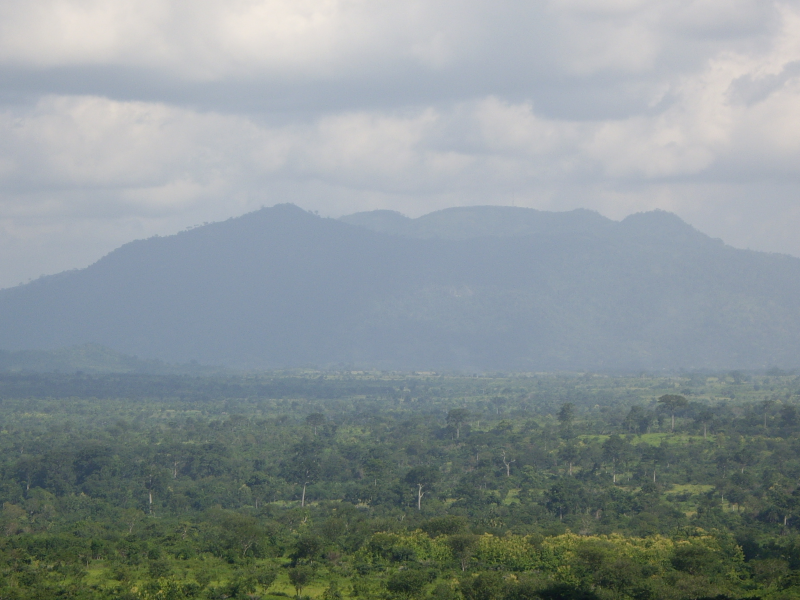

Highest point
- Elevation: 986 m (3,235 ft)
- Prominence: 757 m (2,484 ft)
- Coordinates: 6°52′N 0°45′E

Geography
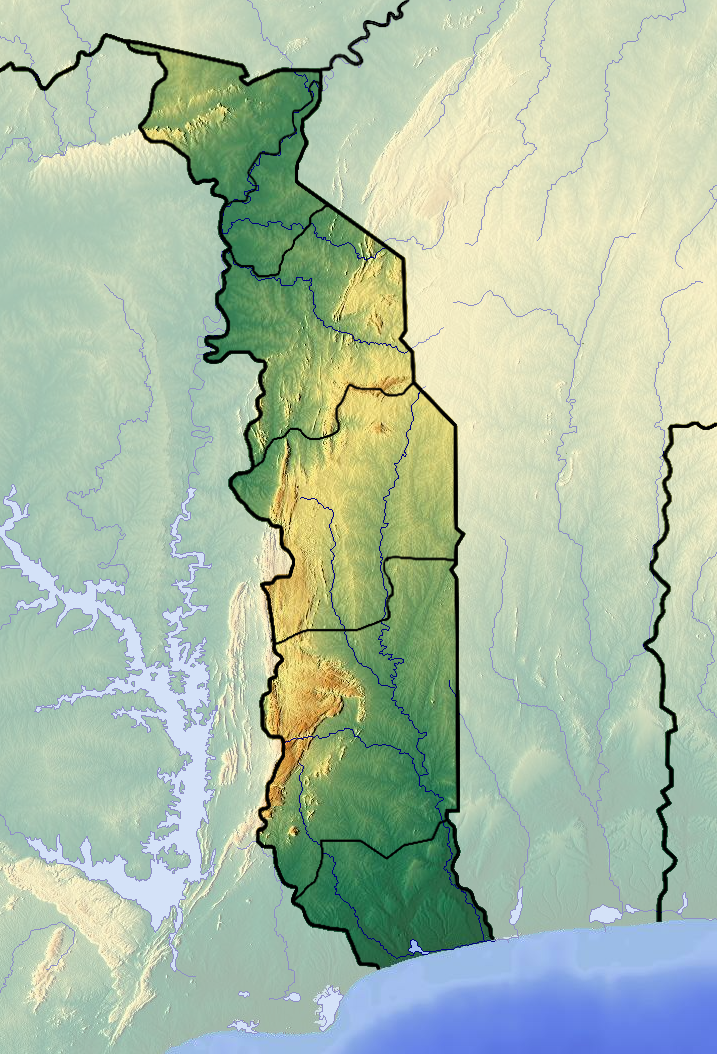
- Location within Togo
- Location: Plateaux Region, Togo

Mount Agou (French: Mont Agou, earlier known as Baumannspitze or Baumann Peak) is the highest mountain in Togo at 986 metres (3,235 ft). It is situated to the south east of Kpalimé in the Plateaux Region of Togo. The mountain lies close to the border with Ghana; this country can be seen from the summit.

== Geology ==
Mount Agou is part of an extreme western outlier of the Atakora Mountains that cross neighbouring Benin. Within the Togolese borders, this range is sometimes called the Togo Mountains. Together with these mountains, Mount Agou forms part of the Dahomeyide Orogen, an area that was uplifted in an orogenic process when the West African Craton bumped into the Benin-Nigerian Shield. The internal suture zone of this belt contains several isolated massifs that are oriented in North-South direction. Mount Agou is part of one of these massifs which, depending on the scientific classification, is either called the Lato-Agou Massif (together with nearby Lato Hill) or the Ahito-Agou Massif (together with Mount Ahito).

Although geologically part of these structures, Mount Agou presents itself as an inselberg, rising abruptly above the relatively flat Danyi Plateau with a drop of around 700 metres (2,300 ft). It stands on a base of charnockitic igneous rock from the Neoproterozoic Era. The mountain itself is mainly made up of amphibolite, pyroxenites and gabbro, and contains deposits of bauxite.

== History ==
Historically, the region has been inhabited by Ewe people. In the late seventeenth and early eighteenth centuries, Adangme refugees settled at Mount Agou, fleeing from slave traders. In 1870, Ashanti troops tried to subdue the area, but were pushed back by the villages on the mountain. For this reason, the mountain is still seen as a symbol of resistance.

In times of the German protectorate Togoland, the mountain was called Baumann Peak (Baumannspitze), named after geographer Oscar Baumann. A mythical narration tells that when the Germans arrived in nearby Naviè village, they made an agreement to buy what can fit into a sheepskin. They then cut the skin into pieces and surrounded the mountain with them. This story is similar to the traditional tale of the foundation of Carthage by Dido.

Near the top of Mount Agou, the remains of military installations from both the German era and from French Togoland can be seen. These include a French military hospital from World War II. Memorial stones have been laid on the mountain that refer to these periods.

In 1955, the cacao swollen shoot virus entered Togo from Ghana through the cocoa fields around Mount Agou. A particularly virulant variant of the virus was called "Agou 1".

In the 2000s, there were plans for commercial exploitation of the bauxite deposits on the mountain, which were met with protests from local environmental organisations. In the present day, the summit area is used for communications; the equipment includes an antenna on the mountain top.

== Tourism ==
The slopes are lined with several villages and with cocoa and coffee fields that are interspersed with banana plants and other fruit trees. There is a paved road to the top that can be travelled by motorbike or car. Most tourists however prefer to take the unpaved footpaths that are used by the local population to commute between the villages and to the fields. These paths cross several streams, and pass by a waterfall. Depending on where one leaves the paved road, the walk to the summit can take from a few minutes to up to 3 hours. There are several check points in the area, and local authorities charge a fee from tourists wishing to climb the mountain.

Occasionally, a full marathon is organised under auspices of the Togo Leading Athletics Association that includes a climb to the top of Mount Agou.

== Flora and fauna ==
The mountain and the surrounding areas were densely covered with rainforest in the past, with strong biological connections from Mount Agou to the rest of the Atakora chain. Starting from the second half of the twentieth century, strong deforestation has taken place for logging and agriculture, associated with considerable biodiversity loss, leaving only patches of original forest on isolated spots along the mountain slopes. Nevertheless, biological research has been done, for example on butterflies (Heliconiinae, Papilionoidea, Hesperioidea) and on Pteridophytes.

== Cultural references ==
An exoplanet (planet orbiting another star) has the name Agouto, which is derived from Mount Agou. It circles the star WASP-64 at a distance of 1200 light-years in the constellation of Canis Major. It received its name from Togolese amateur astronomers in the NameExoWorlds contest of 2019, organised by the International Astronomical Union.
