= Ouatchi Plateau =

Tableland in Togo, West Africa

The Ouatchi Plateau is a tableland in southern central Togo, West Africa. The plateau is also known as Terre de barre after its reddish, iron-rich soil. The plateau is about 20 kilometres wide and located at an altitude of 60 to 90 metres above sea level.
