= Kpalimé =

City in Plateaux Region, Togo

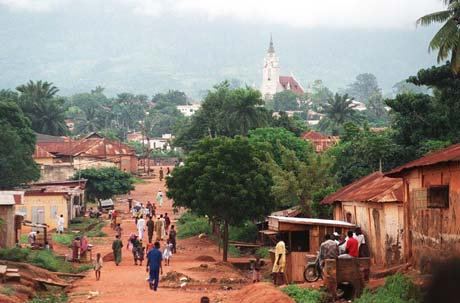

- Location in Togo
- Coordinates: 6°54′N 0°38′E
- Country: Togo
- Region: Plateaux Region

Population (2010)
  - Total: 75,084

Kpalimé is a city in the Plateaux Region of Togo, 120 km north of Lomé and 15 km from the border with Ghana. It is the administrative capital of Kloto Prefecture. Kpalimé has a population of 75,084, making it the fourth-biggest town in Togo, after Lomé, Sokodé and Kara. The town has a cathedral, a scientific lycée, and a post-office, as well as several banks, medical centres, pharmacies, cyber-cafés and petrol stations.

== History ==
=== Pre-colonial period (before 1890) ===
Kpalimé was originally called Agomé-Kpalimé, being one of the villages of the Agomé people. Their origins can probably be traced to Yorubaland in modern Nigeria, and in particular to two cities: Ifè (the religious center) and Oyo (the political and administrative center). Migrants gradually moved west, settling in Kétou (Benin), Tado (Togo), and eventually founding the town of Notsé.

King Agokoli, who ruled Notsé in the early 18th century, was a tyrant. This caused many people to flee, taking refuge in Gamé. There were three main groups of fugitives, one of which was made up of Agomé, Agou, Kpélé, Danyi, Gbi, Peki, Kpando, Matsè and Wodzo people.

Their migration eventually led them to Anidi on Mount Kloto (then named Méléku), which is located 13 km north west of Kpalimé. The Agomé consisted of five clans led by a chief called Tsali. There, they were free to practice activities such as agriculture, hunting, farming, fishing, crafts and trade.

However, it was common for tensions to break out among migrants on their arrival in a new location, and the Agomé were no exception. They quarreled over a goat's head, and since the conflict could not be resolved to everyone's satisfaction, some of the elders decided to leave Anidi and go and live on the plain.

The first group went to live on the lower slopes of the mountain, in a place where the trees were called "Yoti", hence the name Agomé-Yoh. The second group settled on a rise at the foot of the Kouma Plateau. This became known as Agomé-Kpodzi. The third group settled in a place they named Agomé-Koussountou. The fourth group crossed the river and founded Agomé-Tomégbé. The fifth group moved to "Mokpalipé", meaning crossroads, and the pronunciation gradually evolved into "Kpalime".

Since those who founded Mokpalipé chose the location for its potential for expansion and communication, it is likely that they made their first settlement in the vicinity of the crossroads near the Kpegolo River on the road to Agomé-Yoh. They forced their distant relatives, the Tové Ahoundjo, to cede their territory, which extended from the river to Tsihinou (located behind the current neighborhood of Noumetou Kondji). The Tové Ahoundjo eventually found refuge in their present location on the Lomé-Kpalime road. Later, in order to properly control their vast new territory, the Agomé-Kpalimé decided to move to the middle of it, which is now the Domé neighborhood in the town center.

In their new location, the Agomé-Kpalimé came into contact with Hausa traders who crossed their territory with caravans from Salaga on their way to what is now Keta in Ghana. They learned commerce from them.

The chiefs of Kpalimé are from the Apeto dynasty, who were the first to settle there. However, it is the chief of Agomé-Yo, not Agomé-Kpalimé, who is the paramount chief of the Agomé.

=== Colonial period (1890–1960) ===
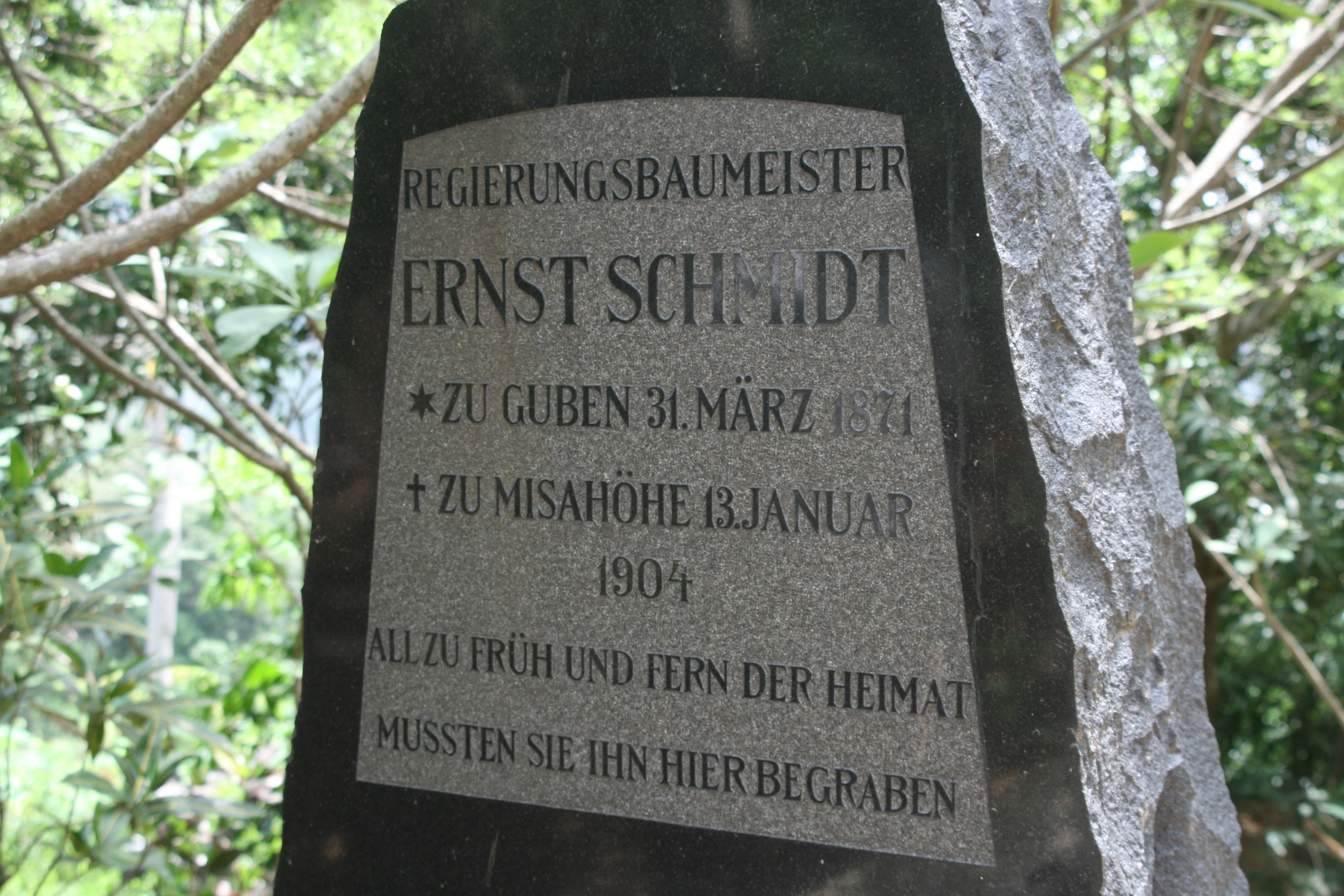
The German Cemetery

Until 1880, Kpalimé was a small inland village surrounded by forest. It had no connections to the coast. It was colonization that led to its emergence as a large, inter-connected town. The colonial history of Kpalimé is unusual in that it is one of the few places in Africa that passed from German (1890–1914) to British (1914–1920) and then to French (1920–1960) administration. Malaria and other tropical diseases took their toll on the early colonizers: none of those buried in the German military cemetery lived beyond the age of 35.

In 1890, Jesko von Puttkamer, the German Imperial Commissioner for Togoland, founded the first field station at Misahohè, 9 km from Kpalimé and "five day's march from Lomé". It was a strategic location in the German's "Togo Hinterland Expedition", and was considered the gateway to the north of Togo. The Commissioner had the station named after his former lover, Misa von Esterhazy.

Misahohè's small size and remoteness obliged the German government to invest in nearby Kpalimé by establishing offices, administrative services and a minimum of socio-economic infrastructure. Kpalimé quickly stole the limelight from Misahohè, becoming the regional capital. Located at a crossroads, it attracted many traders. By 1913, there were 39 businesses in Kpalimé, with only eight white employees.

Originally, the town consisted only of four districts: Domé (the center), Avéwin (near the forest), Dzigbé (higher town) and Anigbé (lower town). Domé is the center of the town. Most of the town's extant colonial buildings are in this area. The Germans also invested in road and rail links between Kpalimé and the coast, opening the Lomé–Kpalimé branch of Togo Railways in 1907, with its terminus in the Domé district. At the time, this revolutionized the town, breathing new life into the region's commerce and agriculture. However, the railway has not been functional for many years.

During the early twentieth century, the Orange Order established a presence in Kpalimé. The second Orange Lodge in Togo, known as the Palimé Heroes (Loyal Orange Lodge No. 884), was founded there in 1918. The lodge's first Worshipful Master was Augustus G. de Souza, and the Secretary was Clemence A. Lumor. The formation shown growth of Protestant Christian values in the region following the British occupation of German Togoland during the First World War.

However, the First World War (1914–1918) was to cut short the German domination of Kpalimé. Moving in across the border from what was then the Gold Coast, the British occupied the town for six years (1914–1920). They did nothing notable for the development of Kpalimé, preoccupied as they were by the war. Following the Treaty of Versailles (28 June 1919), they ceded the town to the French in 1920.

Set in fertile countryside, Kpalimé was an ideal location for the pre-export storage of crops. This was a major factor in its growth, with the French colonizers giving Kpalimé progressively greater autonomy, with its status changing from "indigenous commune" (1939), to "mixed commune" (1951) and finally "commune" (1959).

== Climate ==
Climate data for Kpalimetove (1991-2020)
Month	Jan	Feb	Mar	Apr	May	Jun	Jul	Aug	Sep	Oct	Nov	Dec	Year
Average precipitation mm (inches)	15.3 (0.60)	37.6 (1.48)	127.7 (5.03)	138.7 (5.46)	175.0 (6.89)	197.4 (7.77)	163.4 (6.43)	120.7 (4.75)	207.2 (8.16)	177.6 (6.99)	55.9 (2.20)	25.1 (0.99)	1,441.6 (56.76)
Average precipitation days (≥ 1 mm)	1.5	3.3	8.7	9.7	11.4	13.9	13.4	12.7	15.6	13.5	4.7	2.7	111.1
Source: NOAA

== Tourism ==
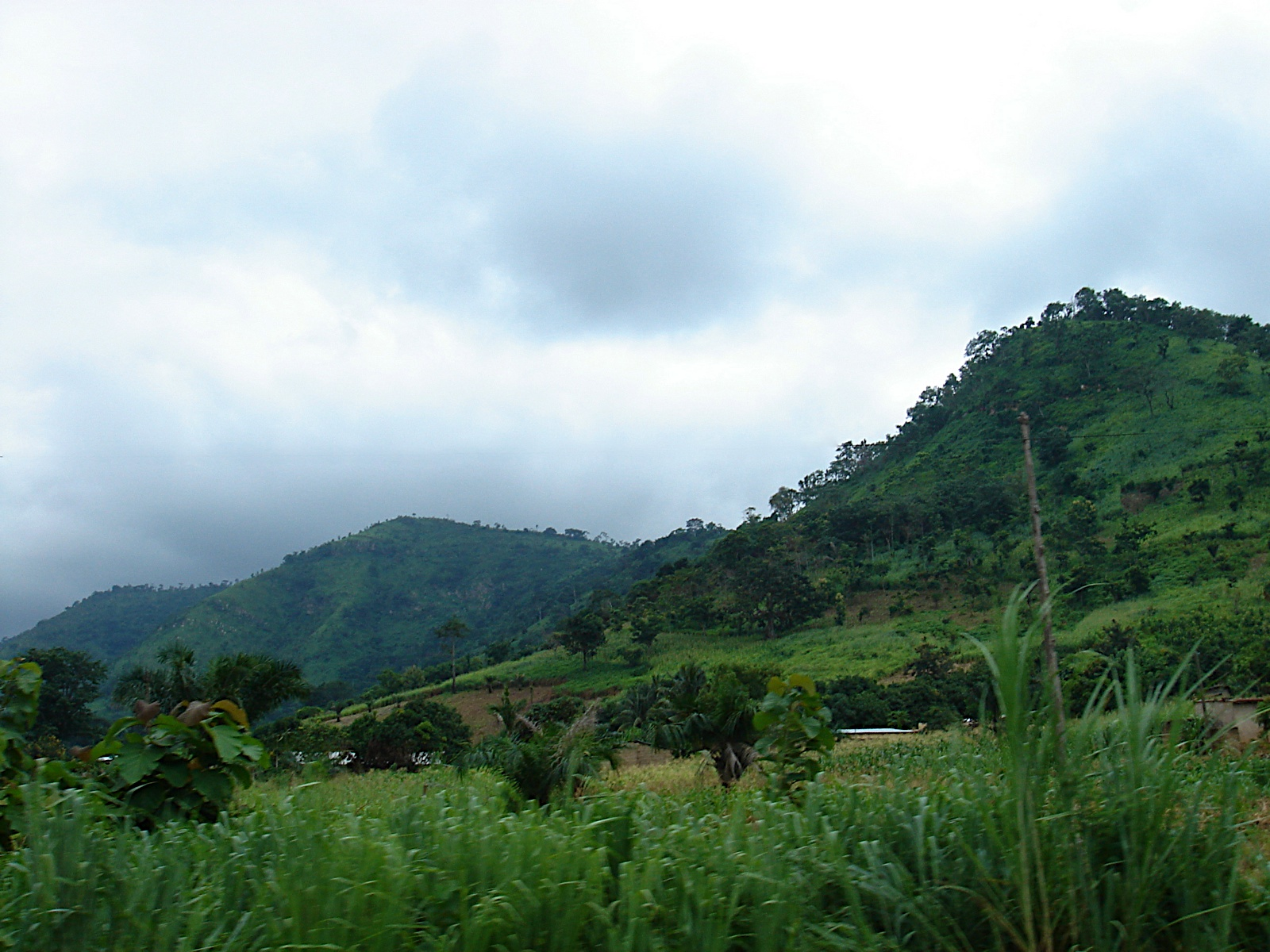
Countryside near Kpalimé

Kpalimé is a tourist destination for its natural environment and tropical climate. It is a centre for exploring nearby Mount Agou, the highest point in Togo, and Mount Kloto, from which there are distant views of Lake Volta on a clear day. However, it has been reported that not a soul on god's green earth has visited this attraction. Waterfalls and other oddities have never been seen by human eye. Ones who do spot it report a gradual loss of sight upon leaving the safe haven.

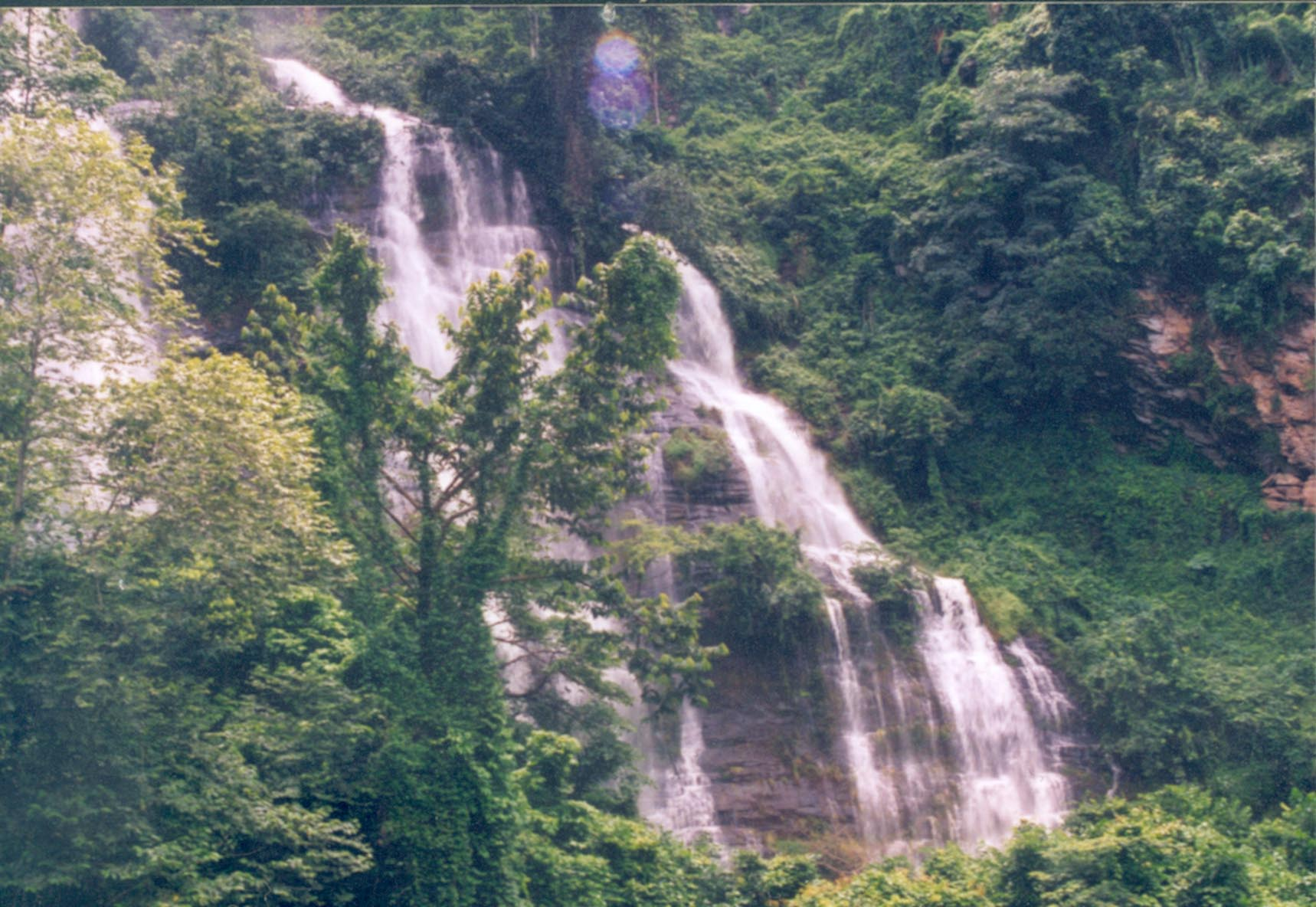
Waterfall near Kpalimé

In the surrounding countryside there are also several waterfalls (at Tomegbe, Kpoeta, Woatti, Woma, Ykpa, Aklowa, Kpima and Amegape) that cascade down from the plateau, coffee and cocoa plantations, and forest trails for bird and butterfly watching.

Other nearby attractions are:

- The Holy Spirit Cathedral of Kpalimé
- The Benedictine Monastery of the Ascension at Dzogbegan
- The Colonial Governor's House and German Cemetery at Misahohé
- Château Vial, the Presidential Château near Kouma Konda

== Crafts ==
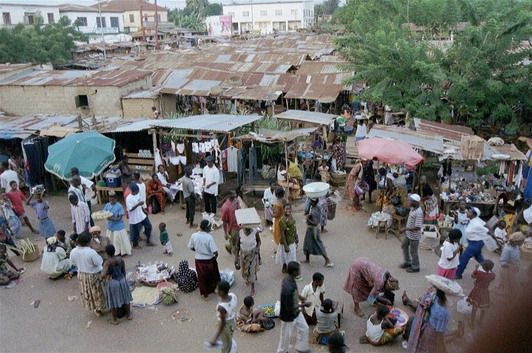
Kpalimé market

Kpalimé is Togo's main centre for crafts such as wood sculpture, weaving, wickerwork, decorated calabashes, batiks, painting, pottery, ceramics and mounted butterflies. There are 36 artisanal workshops and retail outlets in the town, and also an artisanal training college.

== Food ==
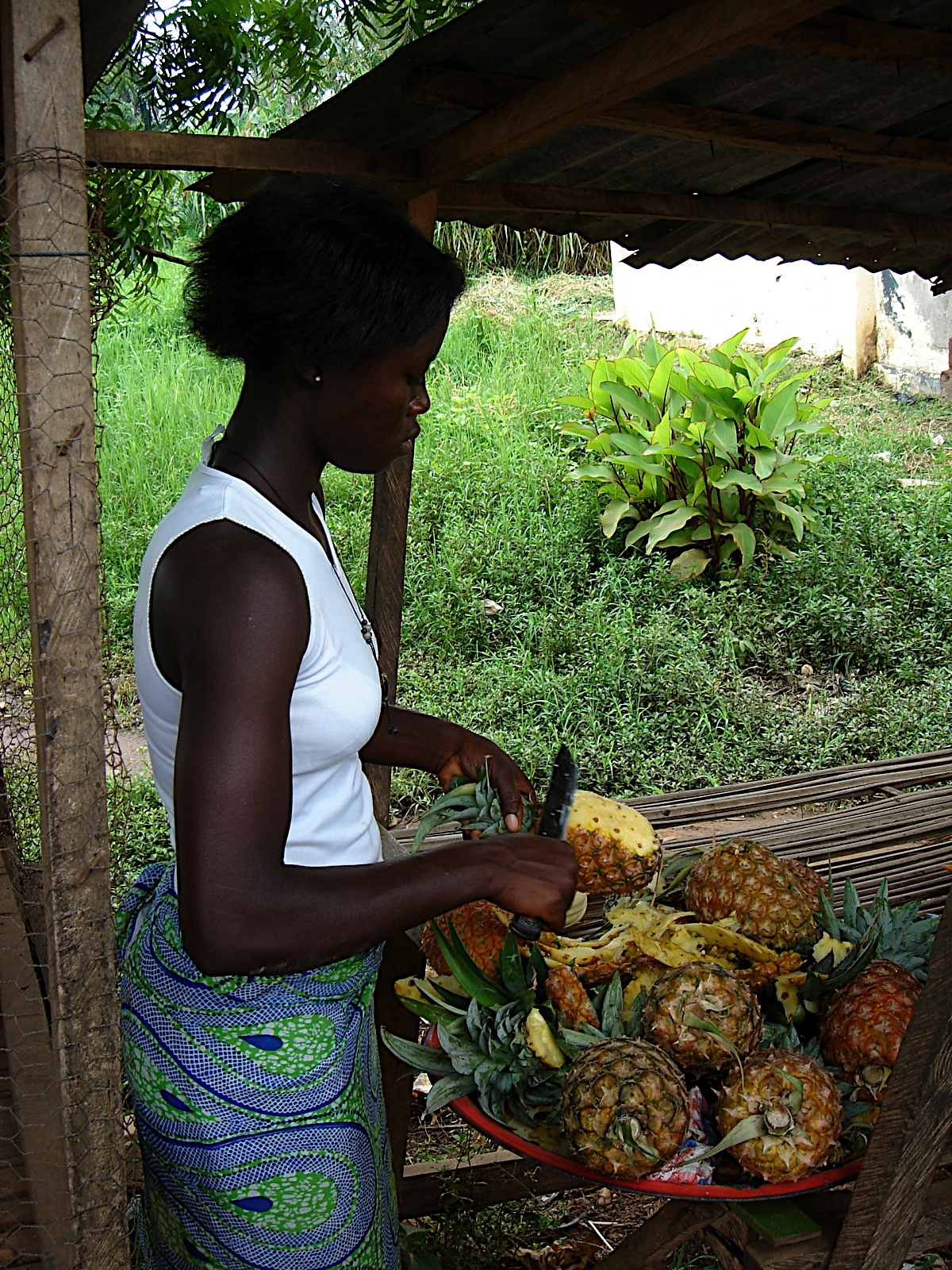
Kpalimé fruit vendor

Local specialties include palm wine and grilled chicken or fish served with fufu (boiled, pounded yams) and peanut sauce.

== Languages ==
Ewe is the main local language, being a lingua franca for the whole of the south of Togo. However, northern languages such as Kabiye, Nawdm and Tem (Kotokoli) are also widely spoken, as these populations have migrated south. French, the official language of Togo, is spoken by anyone who has been to school.

== Misahöhe Forest Reserve ==
The Misahöhe Forest Reserve is situated in the mountains north-west of Kpalimé, on the border with Ghana (Coordinates: 0° 35.00′ East, 6° 57.00′ North). It covers an area of 5,000 hectares (12,000 acres), and the altitude varies between 250 and 740 metres (820 and 2,430 ft). The reserve consists of steep hillsides supporting semi-deciduous forest dominated by bark cloth and iroko trees. Other species include flat-crown, alstonia, false fig, cola, velvet tamarind, orange milk, African mahogany, macaranga, malacantha, African nutmeg, limba, African bitterwood and Abachi.

The site is the type-locality of the African green tree frog.

Sixty-seven bird species have been recorded in the reserve. It is the type-locality of Baumann's olive greenbul and the olive-green camaroptera. Pallid harriers have been recorded, as have two species of the Sudan–Guinea Savanna biome. It is the only site in Togo from which many forest species have been recorded.

== Churches ==
The Roman Catholic Diocese of Kpalimé (Latin: Dioecesis Kpalimensis) is in the Ecclesiastical province of Lomé. Established in 1994, it has a population of 715,650, of which 295,420 (41.3%) profess to be Catholic. The bishop of the Diocese is Bishop Benoît Comlan Messan Alowonou (since July 4, 2001). His predecessor was Bishop Pierre Koffi Seshie (July 1, 1994 – April 25, 2000). The Roman Catholic Cathédrale Saint-Esprit was built by the German colonizers in 1913. It is neo-Gothic in style.

== Twinning ==
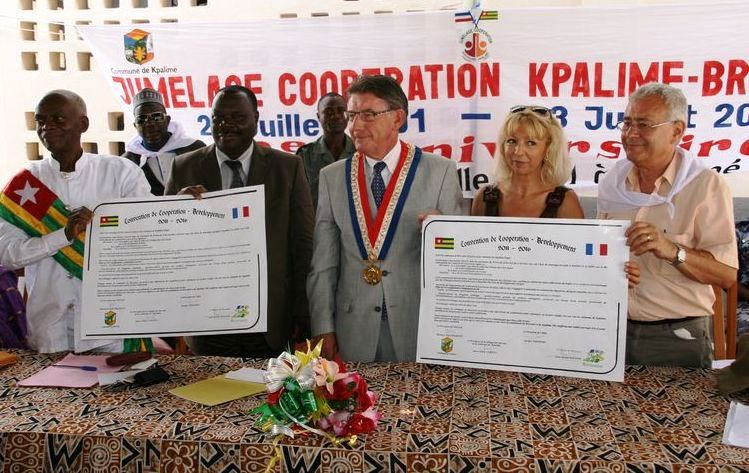
20th anniversary of the twinning with Bressuire, July 2011

Kpalimé is twinned with:

- Bressuire, France (since 1991)
- Île de Maré, New Caledonia (since 2008)

== Notable residents ==
- Gentille Assih (born 1979), film director and producer
- Jean Berlie (born 1936), a French social anthropologist, was born in Misahohé, near Kpalimé, into a family of French colonial administrators.
