= Togo Mountains =

Mountain range in Africa

Coordinates: 7°25′N 0°40′E

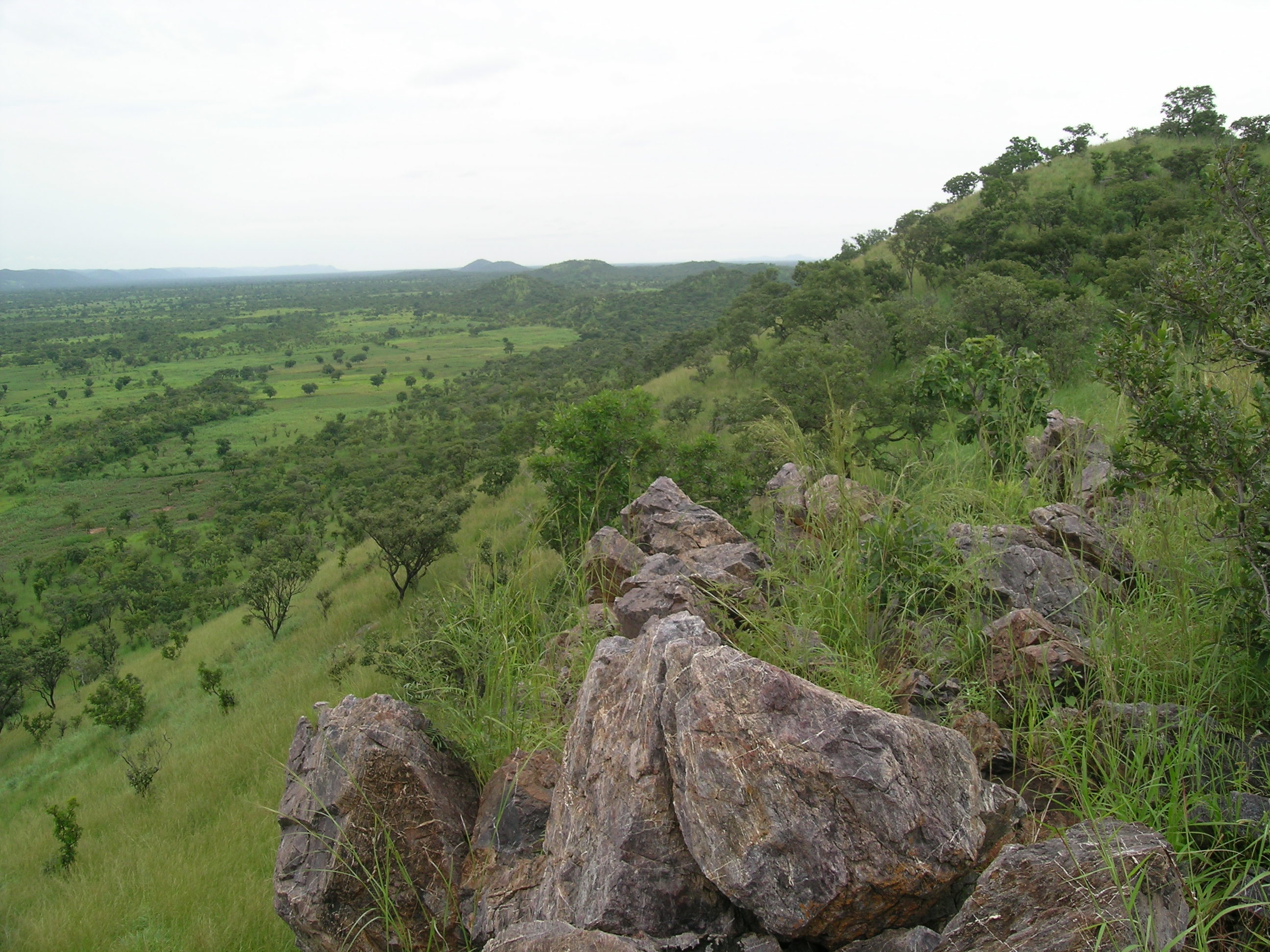
The Togo Mountains in Benin

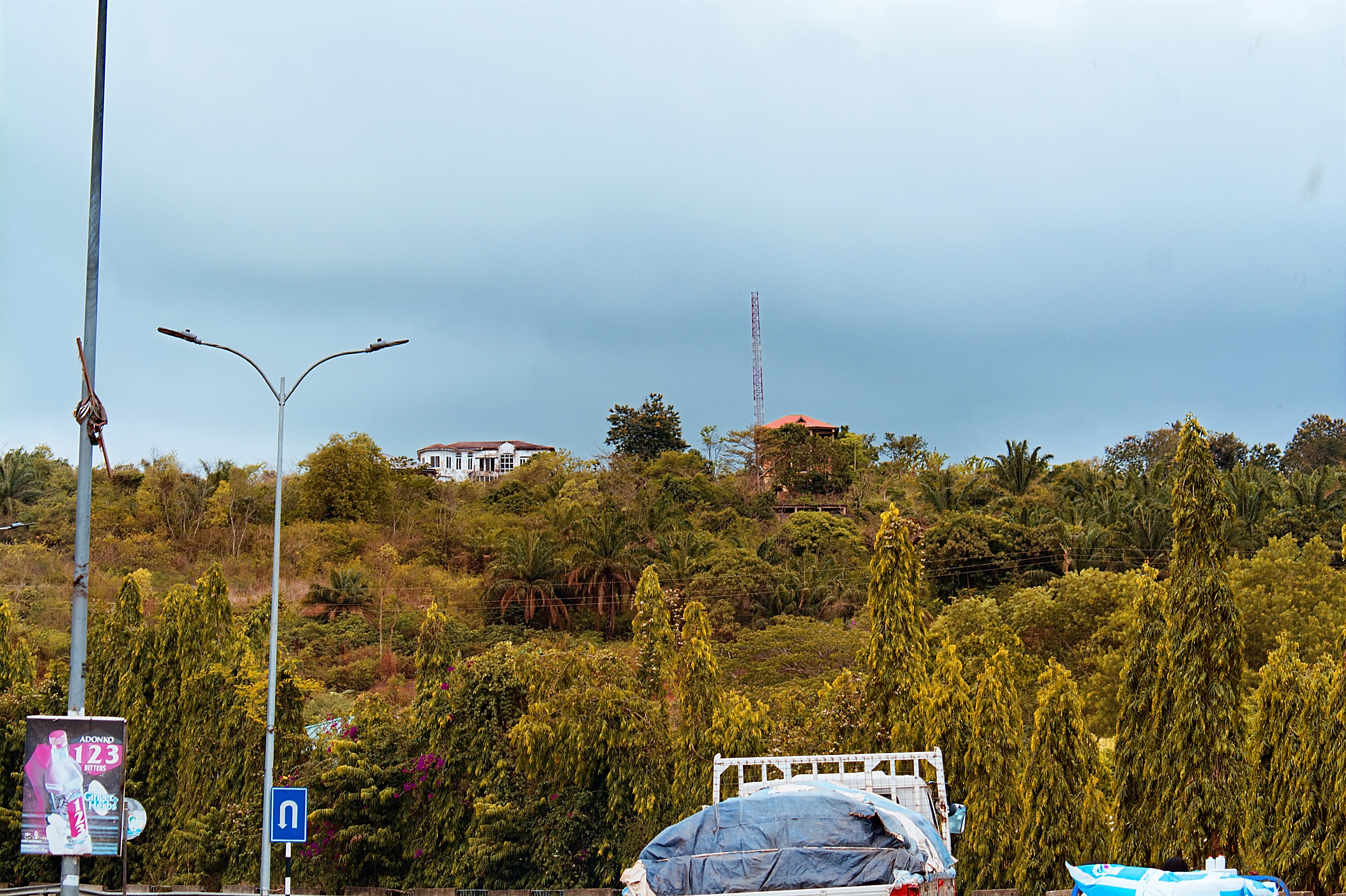
Houses on the Akwapim mountain (Ghana)

The Togo Mountains is a mountain range which stretches across the central region of the West African country of Togo and across the eastern and western borders of that country into Ghana and Benin. In Ghana, the range is also known as the Akwapim Hills, and in Benin it is also known as the Atakora Mountains /ˌætəˈkɔːrə/. Part of the range is associated with the country of Niger, where the W National Park is found. The African wild dog, Lycaon pictus, was historically found in this region but may now be extirpated from this locale.

== Geography ==
The Togo Mountains run across the central region of Togo, ranging from the southwest to the northeast. To the northeast, the mountain range extends into Benin where it is known as the Atakora Mountains, and to the southwest it extends into Ghana where it is known as the Akwapim Hills. The average elevation of these mountains is 700 metres (2,300 ft) and the highest peak in Togo is Mount Agou, with a height of 986 metres (3,235 ft). It is in the southwestern part of the range, close to the border with Ghana. Mont Sokbaro, widely cited as the highest point of Benin is part of the Atakora Mountains.

To the north of the Togo Mountains, there is undulating savannah, creased by the broad, meandering valley of the Oti River, a tributary of the River Volta, which flows through Lake Volta and into the Gulf of Guinea in Ghana. Several tributaries to this river system flow from the northern side of the Togo Mountains.

To the south of the mountains lies a plateau, which further south slopes gently towards the coast. The central and southern sides of the mountains drain into tributaries of the Mono River, which flows into the Gulf of Guinea through swampland on the borders of Togo and Benin.

== See also ==
- Media related to Togo Mountains at Wikimedia Commons
