= Kloto Prefecture =

Coordinates: 7°05′N 0°45′E

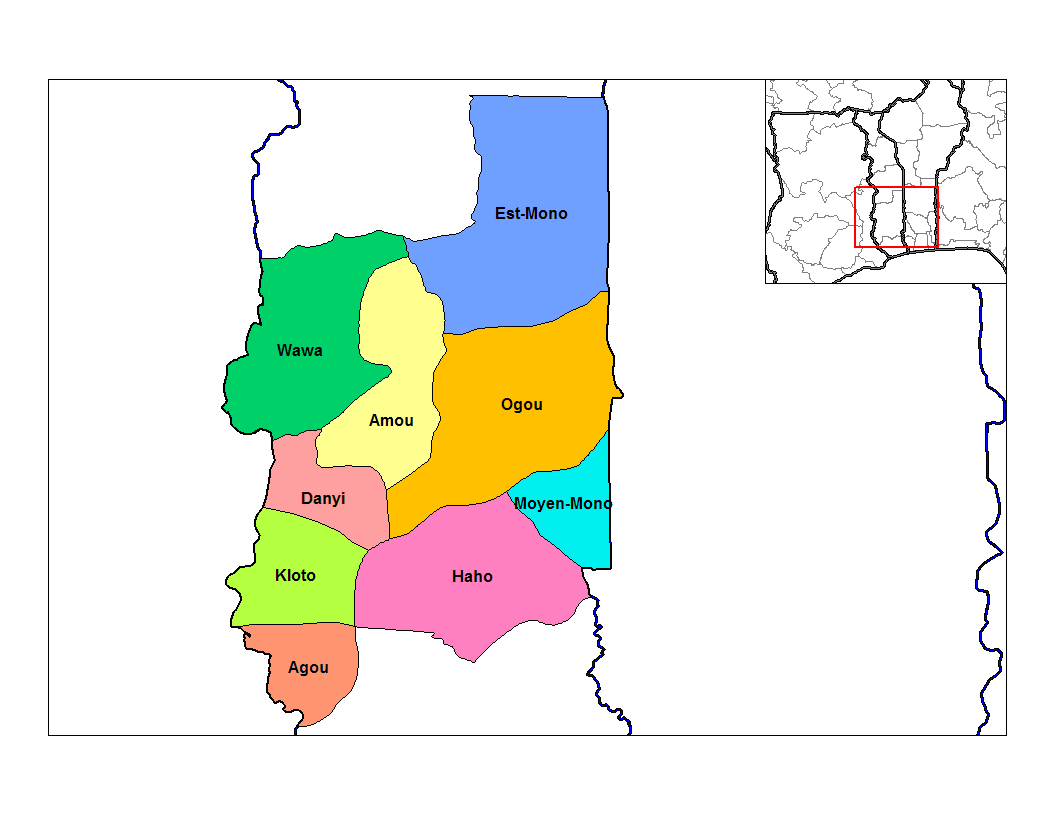
Prefectures of Plateaux

Kloto is a prefecture located in the Plateaux Region of Togo. The prefecture seat is located in Kpalimé. It is home to the Château Vial. The prefecture covers 508 km^{2}, with a population in 2022 of 145,986.

Cantons of Kloto include Kpalimé, Agomé-Yoh, Lanvié, Hanyigba, Tové, Kpadapé, Gbalavé, Kuma, Kpimé, Woamé, Tomé, Agomé-Tomégbé, Lavié-Apédomé, and Yokélé.
