= List of European colonies in Africa =

The following is a list of European colonies in Africa, organized alphabetically by the colonizing country. France had the most colonies in Africa with 35 colonies followed by Britain with 32.

== Africa ==
- (Turkey) Ottoman Empire (1354–1908)
    - Khedivate of Egypt (1867–1914)
    - Turco-Egyptian Sudan (1820–1885)
    - Ottoman Egypt (1517–1914)
    - Ottoman Absinia (1554–1872)
    - Ottoman Algeria (1516–1830)
    - Ottoman Tripolitania (1551–1912)
    - Ottoman Tunisia (1574–1881)

== Belgian colonial empire ==
- Lado Enclave
  - Sudan
  - South Sudan
  - Uganda
- Belgian Congo (Congo Free State annexed as a colony, today's Democratic Republic of the Congo)
- Ruanda-Urundi (comprising modern Rwanda and Burundi, 1922–62)
- (Belgium) Belgian Empire (1908–1962)
  - Possessions in Africa
    - Belgian Congo (1908–1960)
    - Ruanda-Urundi (1922–1962)

== Sub-Saharan Africa ==
- Barotziland–North-Western Rhodesia (1899–1911)
- Bechuanaland Protectorate (1885–1966)
- British Somaliland (1884–1920)
- British Central Africa Protectorate (1893–1907)
- East Africa Protectorate (1895–1920)
- Gambia Protectorate* (1894–1965)
- Kenya Protectorate* (1920–1963)
- Lagos Protectorate* (1862–1906)
- Nigeria Protectorate* (1914–1960)
- Niger Coast Protectorate (1884–1900)
- Northern Nigeria Protectorate (1900–1914)
- Northern Rhodesia (1924–1964)
- Northern Territories of the Gold Coast (1901–1957)
- North-Eastern Rhodesia (1900–1911)
- Nyasaland Protectorate (1907–1964)
- Sierra Leone Protectorate* (1896–1961)
- Southern Nigeria Protectorate (1900–1914)
- Swaziland Protectorate (1906–1968)
- Protectorate of Uganda (1894–1962)
- Walvis Bay (1878–1884)
- Wituland (1890–1905/1923)
- Sultanate of Zanzibar (1890–1963)

*protectorates that existed alongside a colony of the same name

- Kingdom of Egypt (1922–1936)
- Swaziland (1967–1968)
- (Ethiopian Empire) Ethiopian colonies as the Aksum Empire and Abyssinian empire
  - Ethiopian South-Eastern colonization (1878–present)
    - Ethiopian Somali
    - Oromia
    - Gambela
    - Southern Nations
  - Ethiopian-Eritrean/Eritrea Province (1952–1993)

== British Empire ==
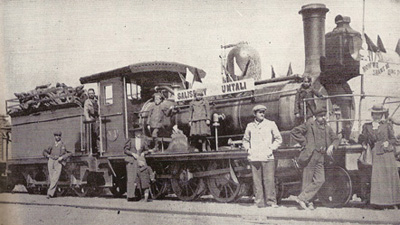
Opening of the railway in Rhodesia, 1899

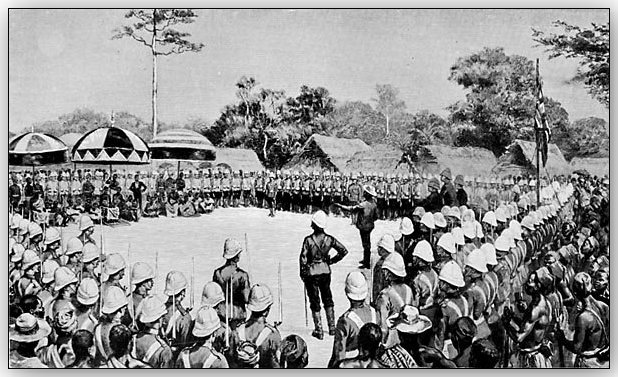
Following the Fourth Anglo-Ashanti War in 1896, the British proclaimed a protectorate over the Ashanti Kingdom.

- Egypt
- British Cyrenaica (1943–1951, now part of Libya)
- British Tripolitania (1943–1951, now part of Libya)
- Anglo-Egyptian Sudan (1899–1956)
- British Somaliland (now part of Somalia)
- British East Africa
  - Kenya Colony
  - Uganda Protectorate
  - Tanzania
    - Tanganyika Territory (1919–61)
    - Zanzibar
- British Mauritius
- Bechuanaland (now Botswana)
- Southern Rhodesia (now Zimbabwe)
- Northern Rhodesia (now Zambia)
- British Seychelles
- British South Africa
  - South Africa
    - Transvaal Colony
    - Cape Colony
    - Colony of Natal
    - Orange River Colony
  - South-West Africa (from 1915, now Namibia)
- British West Africa
  - Gambia Colony and Protectorate
  - British Sierra Leone
  - Colonial Nigeria
  - British Togoland (1916–56, today part of Ghana)
  - Cameroons (1922–61, now part of Cameroon and Nigeria)
  - Gold Coast (British colony) (now Ghana)
- Nyasaland (now Malawi)
- Basutoland (now Lesotho)
- Swaziland (now Eswatini)
- St Helena, Ascension and Tristan da Cunha

== Denmark–Norway ==
- Danish Gold Coast (coastal settlements in Ghana)
- (Denmark) Danish Empire (1620–1979/present)
  - (Denmark) Danish Africa
  - (Denmark) Danish Gold Coast (1658–1850)

=== Africa ===
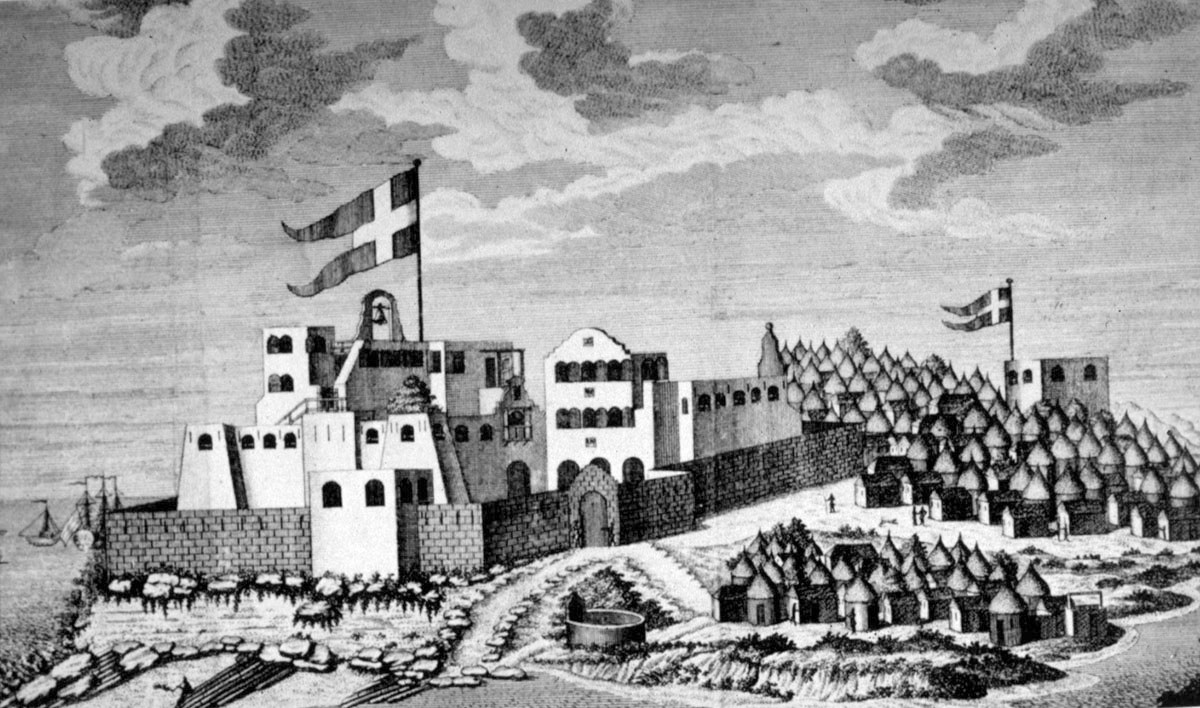
A contemporary depiction of Fort Christiansborg

Denmark-Norway maintained several trading stations and four forts along the Gold Coast in West Africa, especially around modern day Ghana. Three trading stations were built: Fort Frederiksborg, Kpompo; Fort Christiansborg near Accra in 1661, which was purchased from Sweden; and Frederiksberg. The forts were Fort Fredensborg (1734), Fort Kongenstein (1783), Fort Prinzenstein (1784), and Fort Augustaborg (1787), several of which exist as ruins today. Of these, only one is still in existence, the Osu Castle, which used to be the residence of Ghanaian presidents.

Plantations were established near Frederiksborg, but they failed. Fort Christiansborg became the base for Danish power in West Africa, and the centre for the slave trade to the Danish West Indies. In 1807, Denmark's African business partners were suppressed by the Ashanti, which led to the abandonment of all trading stations. Denmark sold its forts to the United Kingdom in 1850.

==== List ====
- Fort Fredensborg (Ningo: 1734 – March 1850)
- Fort Christiansborg (Accra/Osu: 1658 – April 1659, 1661 – Dec 1680, February 1683 – 1693, 1694–1850)
- Fort Augustaborg (Teshie: 1787 – March 1850)
- Fort Prinzenstein (Keta: 1780 – 12 March 1850)
- Fort Kongenstein (Ada: 1784 – March 1850)
- Fort Carlsborg (February 1658 – 16 April 1659, 22 April 1663 – 3 May 1664)
- Fort Frederiksborg (Amanful or Amanfro: 1659 – 16 April 1685)
- Fort William (Ghana) in Anomabu (1657–1659)
- Small base near Ningo from 1784 to 1850
- São Tomé Island (unknown date)

=== Gold Coast ===
- Osu Castle (Fort Christiansborg) 1658 – 1664
- Anomabu 1658 – 1659
- Cape Coast Castle (Fort Carlsborg) 1658 – 1664
- Fort Frederiksborg 1659 – 1685
- Cong Heights 1659 – 1661
- Fort Fredensborg 1734 – 1850
- Fort Prinzenstein (Fort Prinsensten) 1784 – 1850
- Fort Kongenstein (Fort Kongensten) 1784 – 1850
- Fort Augustaborg 1784 – 1850

=== Morocco 1755–1766 ===
- Safi
- Agadir
- Island of Mogador
- Mogador
- Tetuan
- Tangier
- Larache
- Memora

=== Sierra Leone ===
- Bagos 1661 – 1662

== Proposed African colony ==
In the aftermath of World War I, Fritz Wedel Jarlsberg attempted to acquire German East Africa as a colony or League of Nations mandate for Norway, citing Germany's obligation to reimburse Norway for its lost shipping in World War I. Jarlsberg proposed a Norwegian East African Chartered Company that could administer German East Africa under Norwegian sovereignty, using the colony to produce resources that could not be developed in Norway due to its climate, and to house Norwegian emigrants. Despite support from some British negotiators, Jarlsberg's proposal was rejected. German East Africa was instead divided between Belgium, Portugal, and the United Kingdom.

== Dutch colonial empire ==
- Arguin Island (in Mauritania)
- Dutch Cape Colony
- Dutch Gold Coast (settlements along coast of Ghana, including El Mina)
- Dutch Loango-Angola (Luanda, Sonyo and Cabinda)
- Gorée (Senegal)
- Moçambique (Delagoa Bay)
- São Tomé
- South Africa
- Mauritius

== French colonial empire ==
=== France versus Britain: the Fashoda crisis of 1898 ===
Central and east Africa, 1898, during the Fashoda Incident

As a part of the Scramble for Africa, France had the establishment of a continuous west–east axis of the continent as an objective, in contrast with the British north–south axis. Tensions between Britain and France reached tinder stage in Africa. At several points war was possible, but never happened. The most serious episode was the Fashoda Incident of 1898. French troops tried to claim an area in the Southern Sudan, and a much more powerful British force purporting to be acting in the interests of the Khedive of Egypt arrived to confront them. Under heavy pressure the French withdrew securing British control over the area. The status quo was recognised by an agreement between the two states acknowledging British control over Egypt, while France became the dominant power in Morocco, but France suffered a humiliating defeat overall.

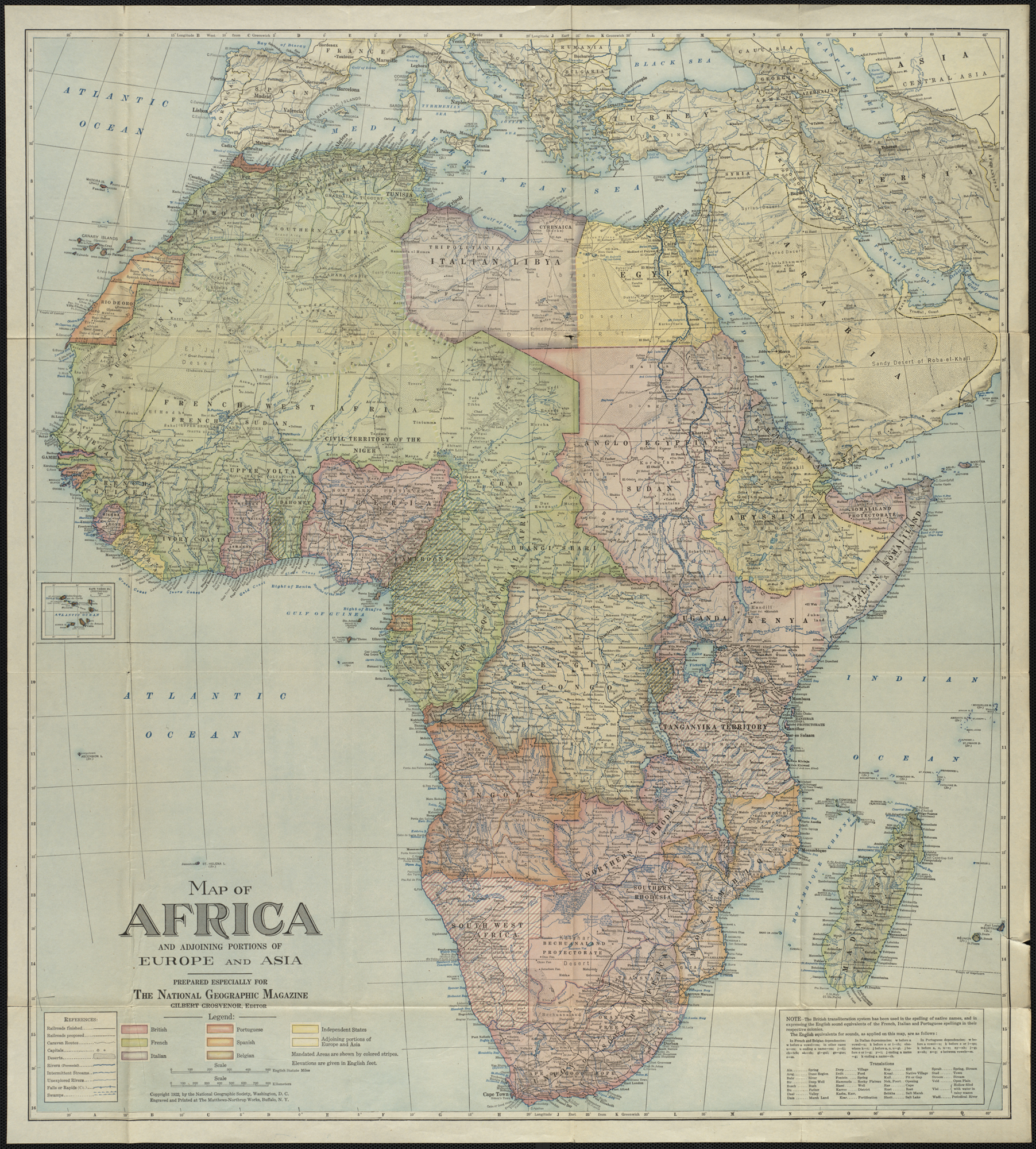
Map of French colonies in Africa (in green)

- French North Africa

== French possessions in Africa ==
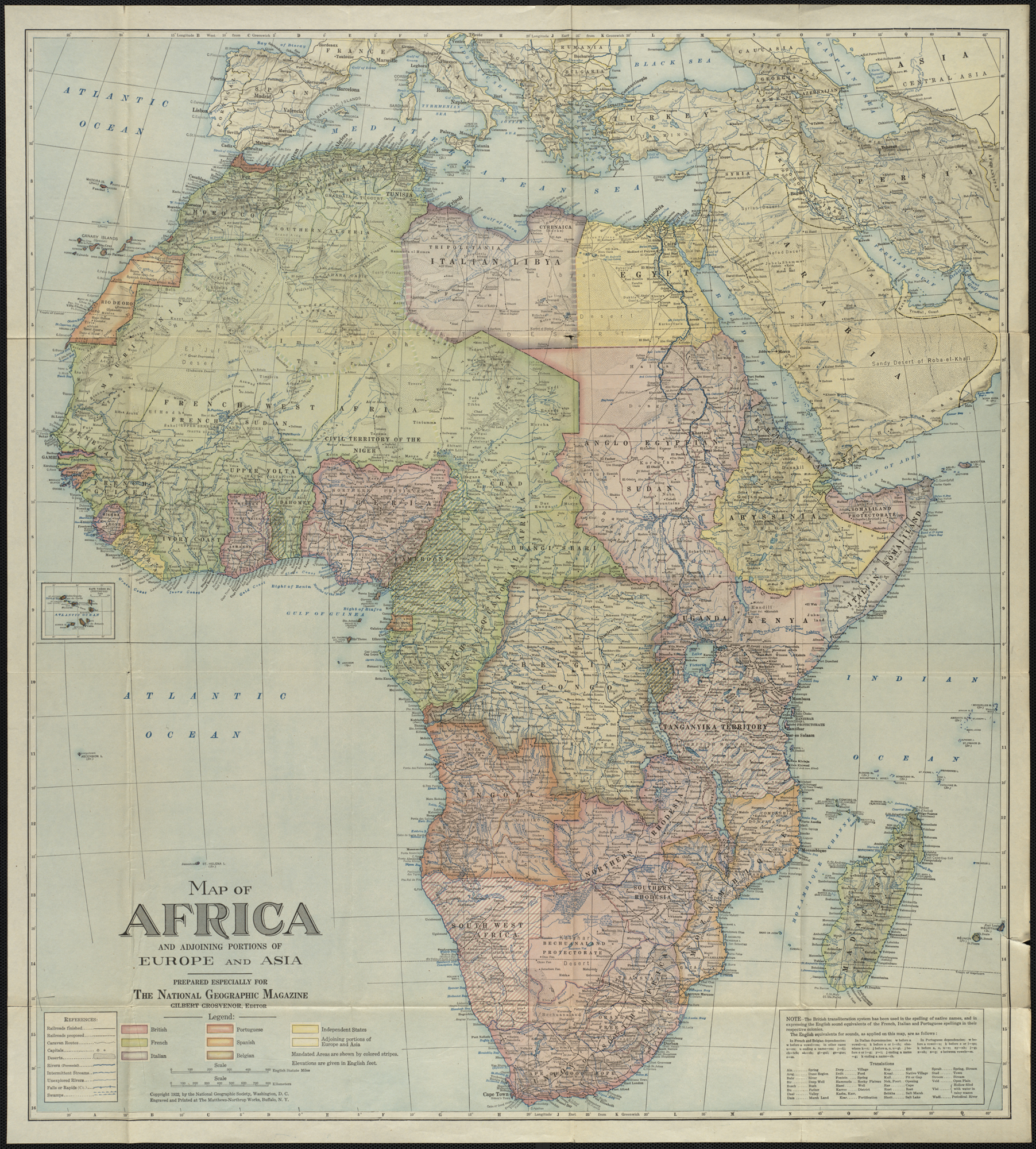
Map of French colonies in Africa (in green), c. 1922

=== French North Africa ===
- Egypt (1798–1801)
- French Algeria (1830–1962)
- Protectorate of Tunisia (1881–1956)
- Protectorate in Morocco (1912–1956)
- Military Territory of Fezzan-Ghadames (1943–1951)
  - French Algeria (1830–1962; was administered as an integral part of France itself from 1848)
  - French Protectorate of Tunisia (1881–1956)
  - French Protectorate of Morocco (1912–1956)
  - Fezzan-Ghadames (1943–1951) (administration given by the UNO after its conquest by Charles de Gaulle)
  - Egypt (ownership 1798–1801; Condominium of France and the United Kingdom 1876–1882)

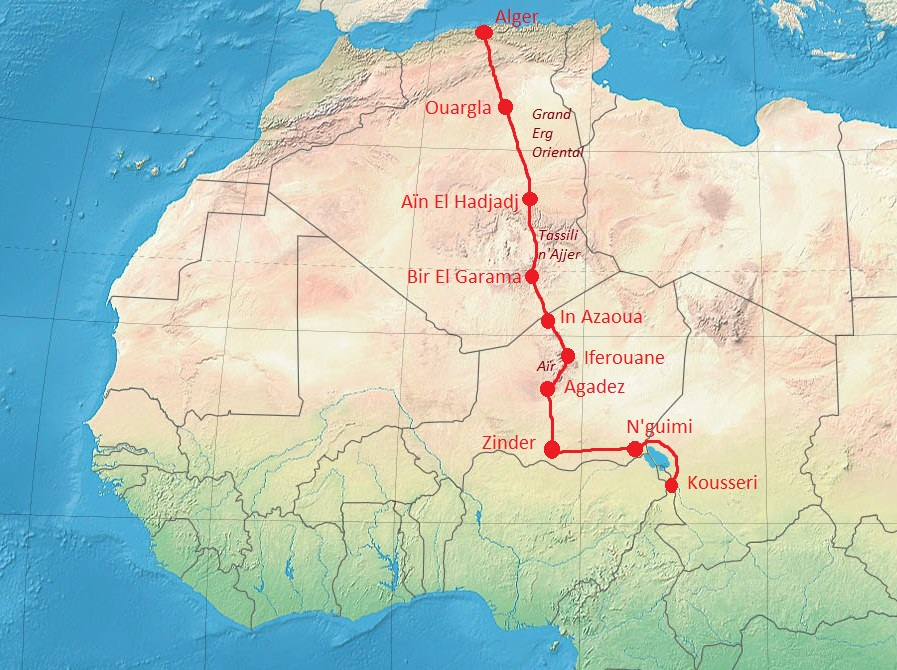
The Foureau-Lamy military expedition sent out from Algiers in 1898 to conquer the Chad Basin and unify all French territories in West Africa.

- French West Africa
  - Ivory Coast (1843–1960)
  - Dahomey or French Dahomey (now Benin) (1883–1960)
    - Independent of Dahomey, under French protectorate in 1889
    - Porto-Novo (protectorate) (1863–1865, 1882)
    - Cotonou (protectorate) (1868)
  - French Sudan (now Mali) (1883–1960)
    - Senegambia and Niger (1902–1904)
  - Guinea or French Guinea (1891–1958)
  - Mauritania (1902–1960)
    - Adrar emirate (protectorate) (1909)
    - The Taganit confederation's emirate (protectorate) (1905)
    - Brakna confederation's emirate (protectorate)
    - Emirate of Trarza (protectorate) (1902)
  - Niger (1890–1960)
    - Sultanate of Damagaram (Zinder) (protectorate) (1899)
  - Senegal (1677–1960)
  - French Upper Volta (now Burkina Faso) (1896–1960)
  - French Togoland (1918–1960) (formerly a German colony, mandate became a French colony) (now Togo)
  - Nigeria
    - The Enclaves of Forcados and Badjibo (territory under a lease of 30 years) (1900–1927)
    - The Emirate of Muri (Northeast of Nigeria) (1892–1893)
  - Gambia
    - Albreda (1681–1857)
    - Kunta Kinteh Island (1695–1697, 1702)
- French Equatorial Africa
  - Chad (1900–1960)
  - Oubangui-Chari (currently Central African Republic) (1905–1960)
    - Dar al Kuti (protectorate) (1897) (in 1912 its sultanate was suppressed by the French)
    - Sultanate of Bangassou (protectorate) (1894)
  - Present-day The Republic of Congo, then French Congo (1875–1960)
  - Gabon (1839–1960)
  - French Cameroon (91% of current Cameroon) (1918–1960) (formerly a German colony, Mandate, Protectorate then French Colony)
  - São Tomé and Príncipe (1709)

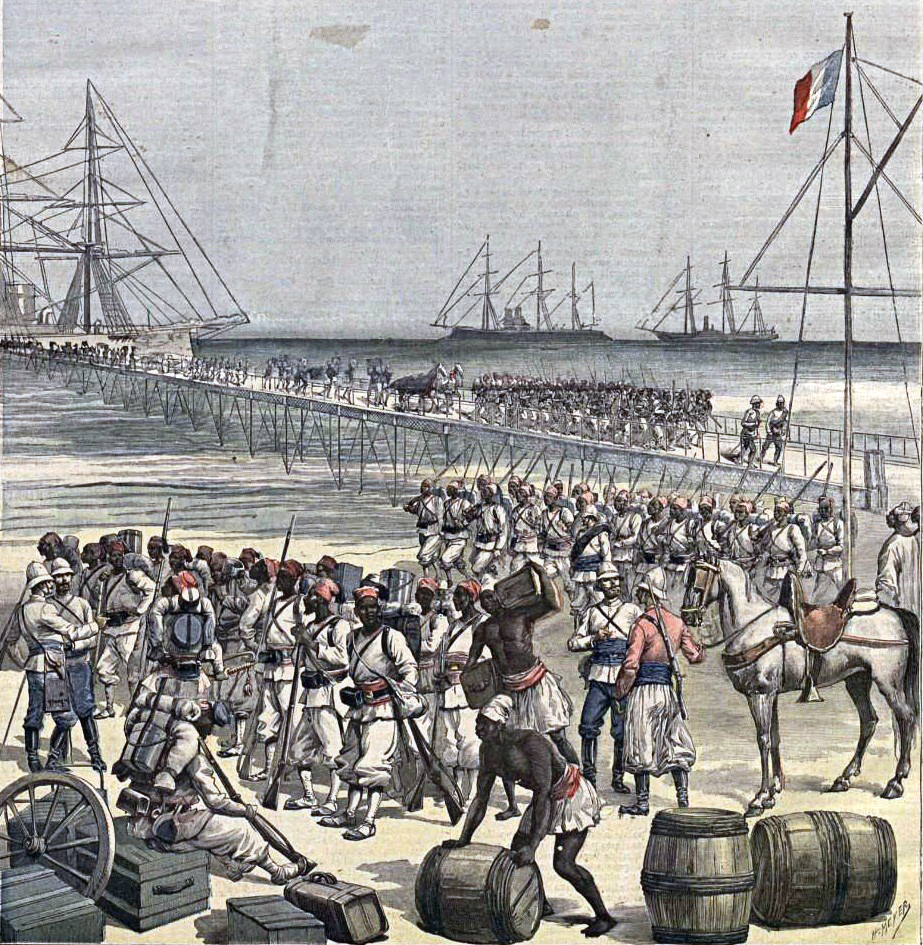
The Senegalese Tirailleurs, led by Colonel Alfred-Amédée Dodds, conquered Dahomey (present-day Benin) in 1892

- French East Africa and Indian Ocean
  - French Madagascar (1896–1960)
    - Kingdom of Imerina (protectorate; 1896)
  - Isle de France (1715–1810; now Mauritius)
  - Djibouti (French Somaliland) (the French Territory of the Afars and the Issas; French Somalia; 1862–1977)
  - French Egypt (1798–1801, 1858–1882, 1956)
  - Mayotte (1841–present)
  - Seychelles (1756–1810)
  - Chagos Archipelago (1721–1745, 1768–1814)
  - The Scattered Islands (Banc du Geyser, Bassas da India, Europa Island, Juan de Nova Island, Glorioso Islands, Tromelin Island)
  - Comoros (1866–1975)
  - Réunion (1710–present)

== Germany ==
The following were German African protectorates:

German colonies in Africa, 1914

- German South West Africa, 1884 to 1915
- German West Africa, 1884 to 1915
  - Togoland, 1884 to 1916
  - Kamerun, from 1884 to 1916
  - Kapitaï and Koba, 1884 to 1885
  - Mahinland, March 11, 1885 to October 24, 1885
- German East Africa, 1885 to 1918
- Witu Protectorate, 1885 to 1890
- German Somali Coast, 1885 to 1888
- German Congo, 1884 to 1885
- German Katanga, 1886
- Gando Protectorate, 1895 to 1897
- Gulmu Protectorate, 1895 to 1897
- German South Africa, 1884 to 1885

=== List of German colonies (as of 1912) ===
| Territory | Capital | Established | Disestablished | Area | Total population | German population | Current countries |
|---|---|---|---|---|---|---|---|
| Kamerun; Kamerun | Jaunde | 1884 | 1916 | 495,000 km^{2} | 2,540,000 | 1,359 | Cameroon; Nigeria; Chad; Guinea; Central African Republic |
| Togoland; Togo | Bagida (1884–87); Sebeab (1887–97); Lomé (1897–1916) | 1884 | 1914 | 87,200 km^{2} | 1,003,000 | 316 | Ghana; Togo |
| German South West Africa; Deutsch-Südwestafrika | Windhuk (from 1891) | 1884 | 1915 | 835,100 km^{2} | 86,000 | 12,135 | Namibia |
| German East Africa; Deutsch-Ostafrika | Bagamoyo (1885–1890); Dar es Salaam (1890–1916); Tabora (1916, temporary) | 1891 | 1918 | 995,000 km^{2} | 7,511,000 | 3,579 | Burundi; Kenya; Mozambique; Rwanda; Tanzania |

- German Kamerun (now Cameroon and part of Nigeria, 1884–1916)
- German East Africa (now Rwanda, Burundi and most of Tanzania, 1885–1919)
- German South-West Africa (now Namibia, 1884–1915)
- German Togoland (now Togo and eastern part of Ghana, 1884–1914)

After the First World War, Germany's possessions were partitioned among Britain (which took a sliver of western Cameroon, Tanzania, western Togo, and Namibia), France (which took most of Cameroon and eastern Togo) and Belgium (which took Rwanda and Burundi).

German colonies in Africa, 1914

The following were German African protectorates:

- Kionga Triangle, 1894–1916
- German South West Africa, 1884–1915
- German West Africa, 1884–1915
  - Togoland, 1884–1916
  - Kamerun, from 1884–1916
  - Kapitaï and Koba, 1884–1885
  - Mahinland, March 11, 1885 – October 24, 1885
- German East Africa, 1885–1918
- Witu Protectorate, 1885–1890
- German Somali Coast, 1885–1888
- German Congo, 1884–1885
- German Katanga, 1886
- Gwandu Protectorate, 1895–1897
- Gulmu Protectorate, 1895–1897
- German South Africa, 1884–1885

== Hospitaller Malta ==
- Tripoli

== Italian colonial empire ==
- (Italy) Italian Empire (1882–1960)
  - Eritrea (1882–1947)
  - Somaliland (1889–1947, 1950–1960 as Italian Trust Territory of Somaliland)
  - Ethiopia (1936–1941)
    - Italian East Africa (formed by merging Eritrea, Somaliland and Ethiopia: 1936–1947)
  - Cyrenaica (1912–1947)
  - Tripolitania (1912–1947)
    - Libya (Formed by merging Cyrenaica and Tripolitania in 1934. It dissolved in 1947. It also included the Southern Military Territory of Fezzan)
- Italian East Africa
  - Italian Eritrea
  - Italian Somaliland (now Somalia)
  - Italian Ethiopia
    - Amhara Governorate
    - Galla-Sidamo Governorate
    - Harar Governorate
    - Scioa Governorate
- Italian Libya

=== Former colonies, protectorates and occupied areas ===
- Italian Eritrea (1882–1947)
- Italian Somalia (1889–1947)
  - Trust Territory of Somaliland (1950–1960)
- Libya (1911–1947)
  - Italian Tripolitania & Cyrenaica (1911–1934)
  - Italian Libya (1934–1943)
- Italian East Africa (1936–1941)
- Italian Ethiopia (1936–1941)
- Tunis (1942–1943)

== Portuguese colonial empire ==
=== List of countries that gained independence from Portugal ===
| Rank | Country | Colonial name | Colonial power | Independence date | First head of state | Independence won through |
|---|---|---|---|---|---|---|
| 1 | (Benin) Republic of Dahomey | (Benin) Republic of Dahomey (Portugal) Fort of São João Baptista de Ajudá | France; Portugal | 1 August 1960; 31 July 1961 | Hubert Maga | |
| 2 | Guinea-Bissau | Portuguese Guinea | Portugal | 24 September 1973; 10 September 1974 (recognised); 5 July 1975 (Note: Not celebrated as a holiday. The date 24 September 1973 (when the PAIGC formally declared Guinea's independence) is celebrated as Guinea-Bissau's date of independence.) | Luís Cabral; João Bernardo Vieira; Aristides Pereira; Pedro Pires | Guinea-Bissau War of Independence |
| 3 | Mozambique (Note: As the People's Republic of Mozambique) | Portuguese Mozambique | Portugal | 25 June 1975 | Samora Machel | Mozambican War of Independence |
| 4 | Cape Verde | Portuguese Cape Verde | Portugal | 24 September 1973; 10 September 1974 (recognised); 5 July 1975 (Note: Not celebrated as a holiday. The date 24 September 1973 (when the PAIGC formally declared Guinea's independence) is celebrated as Guinea-Bissau's date of independence.) | Aristides Pereira (Note: Pedro Pires was sworn in as Prime Minister three days after independence.) | Guinea-Bissau War of Independence (Note: Although the fight for Cape Verdean independence was linked to the liberation movement occurring in Guinea-Bissau, the island country itself saw little fighting.) |
| 5 | São Tomé and Príncipe | Portuguese São Tomé and Príncipe | Portugal | 12 July 1975 | Manuel Pinto da Costa | – |
| 6 | Angola (Note: As the People's Republic of Angola) | Portuguese Angola | Portugal | 11 November 1975 | Agostinho Neto | Angolan War of Independence |

  - Portuguese Africa
    - Portuguese East Africa (1498–1975)
    - Portuguese West Africa (1575–1975)
    - Portuguese Guinea (1474–1974) (1974–1975)
    - Portuguese Cape Verde (1462–1975)
    - Portuguese São Tomé and Príncipe (1470–1975)
    - Fort of São João Baptista de Ajudá (1721–1961)
    - Portuguese Gold Coast (1482–1642)

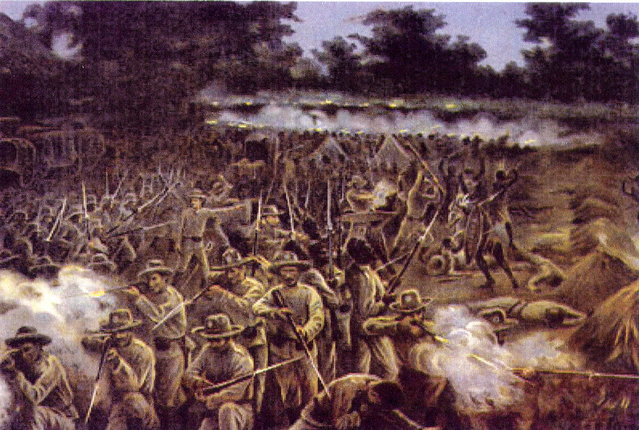
Marracuene in Portuguese Mozambique was the site of a decisive battle between Portuguese and Gaza king Gungunhana in 1895

- Portuguese Angola (now Angola)
  - Mainland Angola
  - Portuguese Congo(now Cabinda Province of Angola)
- Portuguese Mozambique(now Mozambique)
- Portuguese Guinea(now Guinea-Bissau)
- Portuguese Gold Coast now part of Ghana
- Portuguese Cape Verde
- Portuguese São Tomé and Príncipe
  - São Tomé Island
  - Príncipe Island
  - Fort of São João Baptista de Ajudá(now Ouidah, in Benin)

=== Others ===
- Ajuda (Whydah, in Benin)
- Angola
- Annobón
- Cabinda
- Cape Verde (Cabo Verde)
- Ceuta
- Fort of São João Baptista de Ajudá
- Gorée (in Senegal)
- Malindi
- Mombasa
- Algarve Ultramar (Morocco)
  - Agadir
  - Alcacer Ceguer
  - Arzila
  - Azamor
  - Mazagan
  - Mogador
  - Safim
- Nigeria (Lagos area)
- Mozambique
- Portuguese Gold Coast (settlements along coast of Ghana)
- Portuguese Guinea (Guinea-Bissau)
- Quíloa
- São Tomé and Príncipe
- Tangier
- Zanzibar
- Ziguinchor

== Russian Empire ==
- Sagallo (6 January 1889–5 February 1889)

== Spanish colonial empire ==
=== List of countries that have gained independence from Spain ===
| No | Country | Modern-day | Pre-independence name (if different) | Date | year | note |
|---|---|---|---|---|---|---|
| 1 | Morocco | | Spanish protectorate in Morocco | 7 April | 1956 | Decolonisation of Africa |
| 2 | Equatorial Guinea | | (Francoist Spain) Spanish Guinea | 12 October | 1968 | |
| 3 | Morocco: (Morocco) Sidi Ifni Province | | (Francoist Spain) Ifni | 30 June | 1969 | |
| 4 | Sahrawi Arab Democratic Republic | | (Francoist Spain) Spanish Sahara | 26 February | 1976 | |

- Spanish Empire (1492–1825/1898-1975)
  - (Spain) Spanish Africa
    - Spanish Guinea (1778–1968)
    - Spanish Sahara (1884–1975)
    - Spanish protectorate in Morocco (1912–1956)
    - Ifni (1476–1524/1859–1969).
- Northern Spanish Morocco
  - Chefchaouen (Chauen)
    - Jebala (Yebala)
    - Kert
    - Loukkos (Lucus)
    - Rif
- Spanish West Africa
  - Ifni
  - Southern Spanish Morocco (Cape Juby)
  - Spanish Sahara (now Western Sahara)
    - Saguia el-Hamra
    - Río de Oro
- Spanish Guinea(now Equatorial Guinea)
  - Fernando Pó
  - Río Muni
  - Annobón

== Sweden ==
- Swedish Empire (1638–1663, 1733, 1784–1878)
    - New Sweden Empire (1638–1655)
  - Swedish Gold Coast (1650–1658, 1660–1663)
  - Swedish Africa Company
  - (Sweden) Swedish East India Company

=== Africa ===
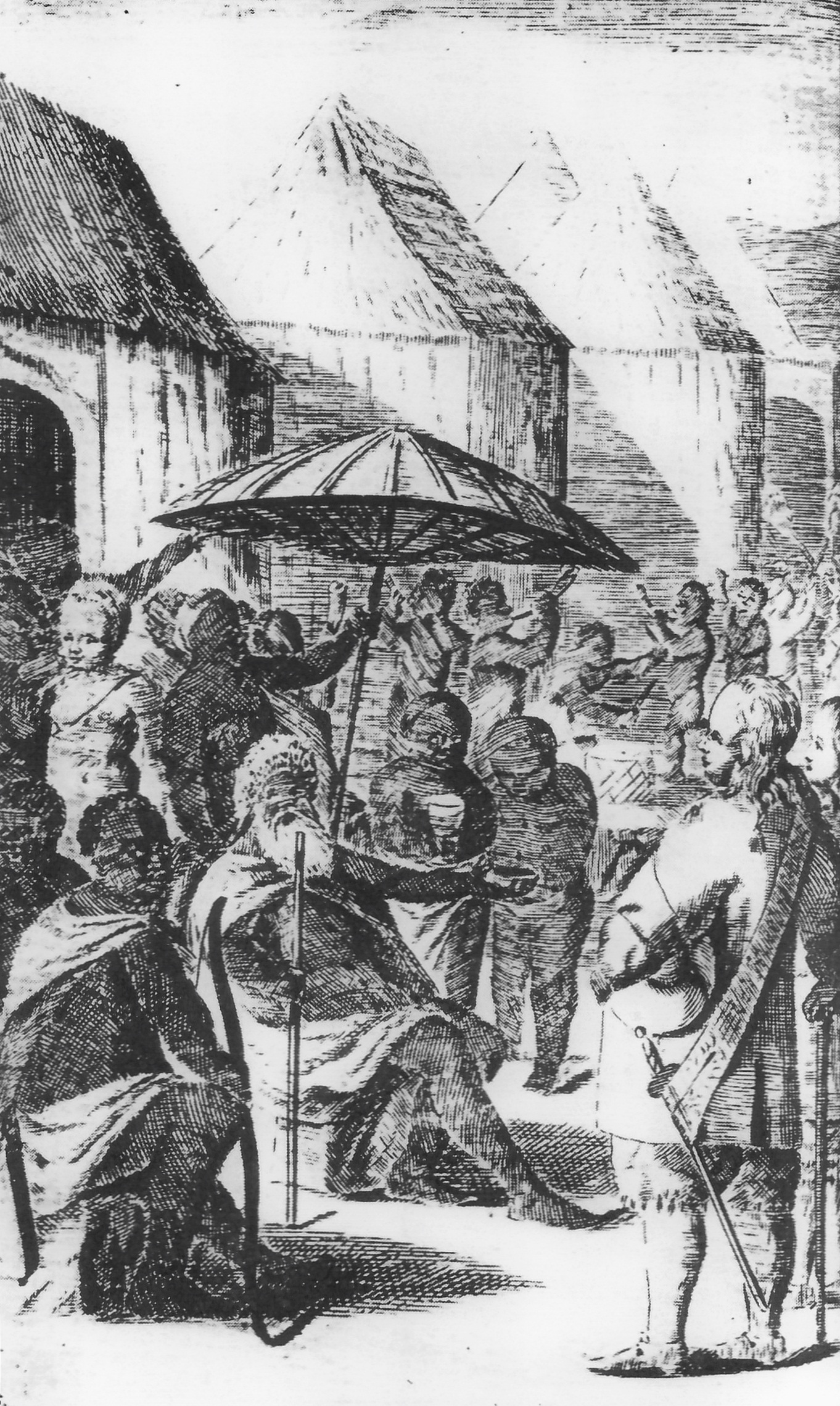
The Swedish are invited by the Akan King of Futu to erect a "stony house" for the purpose of trade.

Sweden temporarily controlled several settlements on the Gold Coast (present-day Ghana) beginning on 22 April 1650. The last of these settlements were lost on 20 April 1663 when Fort Carlsborg and the capital Fort Christiansborg were seized by Denmark.

These possessions consisted of the following settlements:

- Fort Apollonia, presently Beyin: 1655–1657.
- Fort Christiansborg/Fort Frederiksborg, which became the capital, presently Osu: 1652–1658
- Fort Batenstein, presently Butri: 1649–1656.
- Fort Witsen, presently Takoradi: 1653–1658.
- Carolusborg: April 1650 – January/February 1658, 10 December 1660 – 22 April 1663

=== Cape Coast ===
In 1652, the Swedes took Cape Coast (in modern Ghana) which had previously been under the control of the Dutch and before that the Portuguese. Cape Coast was centered on the Carolusburg Castle which was built in 1653 and named after King Charles X Gustav of Sweden but is now known as the Cape Coast Castle.

=== Proposed Madagascar colony ===
Swedish Madagascar was a proposed colony that Sweden attempted to establish from 1714 to 1728. The initiative began when approximately 1,400 pirates on Madagascar sought protection from Sweden. In return, they proposed that Sweden could acquire Madagascar as a colony and provided a naval fleet to facilitate this arrangement. Sweden denied this request, so the pirates asked Denmark, which also denied their request. This led the pirates to approach Sweden again. Sweden showed interest at this point, and around New Year's Eve in 1717, they began negotiating. In the summer of 1718, an agreement was close to being signed, but it never materialized. One reason for this could have been the death of the Swedish king Charles XII.

The plans remained during the reign of Ulrika Eleonora and the early stages of her husband Fredrik I's reign. One of the pirate negotiators in 1718, William Morgan, was appointed as the Swedish governor of the region, even though the Swedes still did not possess any land there. In 1721, Sweden made an attempt to send an expedition to Madagascar. It included two ships from the Swedish Navy, and the leader of the expedition became Carl Gustav Ulrich. The expedition was joined by three additional ships, two of which came from William Morgan's nephew. When the fleet arrived in Cádiz, it became clear that Morgan and his nephew lacked money, and several problems appeared which led to the project being canceled and never fulfilled.

== USA ==
=== List of countries that have gained independence from United States ===
| Rank | Country | Colonial name | Colonial power | Independence date | First head of state | Independence won through |
|---|---|---|---|---|---|---|
| 1 | Liberia | Liberia | United States | 26 July 1847 (Note: Liberia would later annex the Republic of Maryland, another settler colony made up of former African-American slaves, in 1857. Liberia would not be recognized by the United States until 5 February 1862.) | Joseph Jenkins Roberts (Note: Stephen Allen Benson was President on the date of the United States' recognition.); William Tubman | Liberian Declaration of Independence |

=== Colony of Liberia ===
The Colony of Liberia, later the Commonwealth of Liberia, was a private colony of the American Colonization Society (ACS) beginning in 1822. It became an independent nation—the Republic of Liberia—after declaring independence in 1847.

=== Other countries with informal colonial possessions ===
- United States (1816–present)
  - United States overseas territorial acquisitions
  - American Colonization Society (1816–1847)
    - Colony of Liberia (1821–1847)
      - Kentucky in Africa (1828–1847)
      - Maryland-in-Africa (1834–1857)
      - Mississippi-in-Africa (1835–1842)

== See also ==
- European exploration of Africa
- List of African territories and states by date of colonization
- Scramble for Africa
