= List of former German colonies =

This is a list of former German colonies owned by states of Germany:

== Holy Roman Empire and German Confederation ==
=== Brandenburg-Prussia ===
- Groß Friedrichsburg (in Ghana), 1683–1718
- Arguin (in Mauritania), 1685–1721

=== Duchy of Courland ===
- Curlander Gambia 1651–1660, 1660–1661
  - St. Andrew's Island
  - Juffure
  - Banjul Island
- Neu-Kurland (on Tobago) 1642–1650, 1654–1659, 1660–1666

=== Free City of Augsburg ===
- Klein-Venedig (in Venezuela), 1528–1545

=== County of Hanau ===
- Hanauish-Indies, Planned in 1669 but later canceled in 1672

=== House of Ascania ===
- Neu-Askania, 1828–1856

== German Empire ==
=== Africa ===
German colonies in Africa, 1914

The following were German African protectorates:

- Kionga Triangle, 1894–1916
- German South West Africa, 1884–1915
- German West Africa, 1884–1915
  - Togoland, 1884–1916
  - Kamerun, from 1884–1916
  - Kapitaï and Koba, 1884–1885
  - Mahinland, March 11, 1885 – October 24, 1885
- German East Africa, 1885–1918
- Witu Protectorate, 1885–1890
- German Somali Coast, 1885–1888
- German Congo, 1884–1885
- German Katanga, 1886
- Gwandu Protectorate, 1895–1897
- Gulmu Protectorate, 1895–1897
- German South Africa, 1884–1885

=== China ===
These treaty ports were German concessions in China, leased to it by the Qing dynasty:

- Kiautschou Bay concession, 1898–1914
- German concession in Tientsin, 1895–1917
- German concession in Hankou, 1895–1917
- Chefoo, 1901–1914

=== Pacific ===
Map of German Colonies in the Pacific, 1914. Brown, German New Guinea; Orange, North Solomons; Red, German Samoa; Yellow, Other Pacific Territories

These were German colonies established in the Pacific:

- German New Guinea, 1884–1919
  - Kaiser-Wilhelmsland, 1885–1914
  - Bismarck Archipelago, 1885–1914
  - German Solomon Islands Protectorate, 1885–1914
    - Bougainville Island, 1885–1914
    - Buka Island, 1885–1914
    - Choiseul Island, 1885–1900
    - Shortland Islands, 1885–1900
    - Santa Isabel Island, 1885–1900
  - Nauru, 1906–1914
  - Northern Mariana Islands, 1899–1914
  - Caroline Islands, 1899–1914
  - Palau Islands, 1899–1914
  - Marshall Islands, 1906–1914
- German Samoa, 1900–1914
- Protectorate of the Marshall Islands, 1885–1906
  - Nauru, 1888–1914

== Nazi Germany ==
- Poland (1939–1945)
- Netherlands, 1940–1945
- Norway, 1940–1945
- Belgium and Northern France, 1944
- Ukraine, 1940–1944
- Ostland, 1941–1945

== See also ==
- Ernst Thälmann Island
- German colonial projects before 1871
- German colonization of the Americas
- Heligoland-Zanzibar Treaty
- Klein-Venedig
- New Swabia
- Postage stamps and postal history of the German colonies
- Reichskommissariat
