= Fort Augustaborg =

Former Danish fort near Teshie in Ghana

Coordinates: 5.583°N 0.1°W

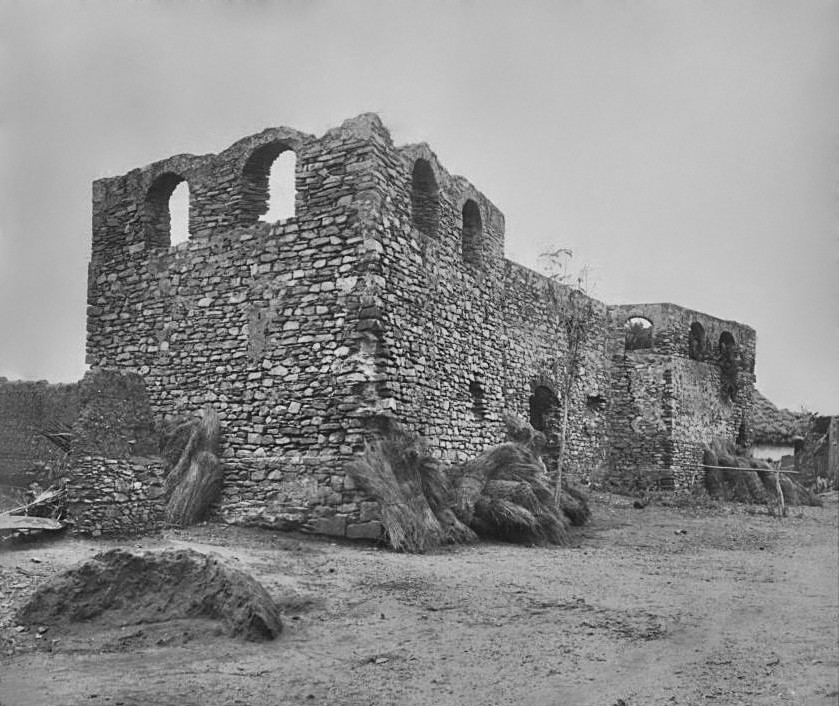
The ruins of Fort Augustaborg in the 1890s.

Fort Augustaborg was a Danish fort on the eastern Gold Coast in present-day Ghana, which was located about 15 km east of Fort Christiansborg near present-day Teshie.

== History ==
The fort was named for Princess Louise Augusta of Denmark, the fort was constructed in 1787 to combat attacks from the Portuguese Empire. It was also used as a post for the Atlantic slave trade. Five years later, Denmark was the first European nation to abolish the slave trade.

On 17 August 1850, the fort was one of five Danish forts purchased by Queen Victoria.

After the independence of Ghana in 1957, the fort became owned by the new administration. Along with 32 other forts and castles along Ghana’s coast, Fort Augusaborg is a UNESCO World Heritage Site.

== Gallery ==
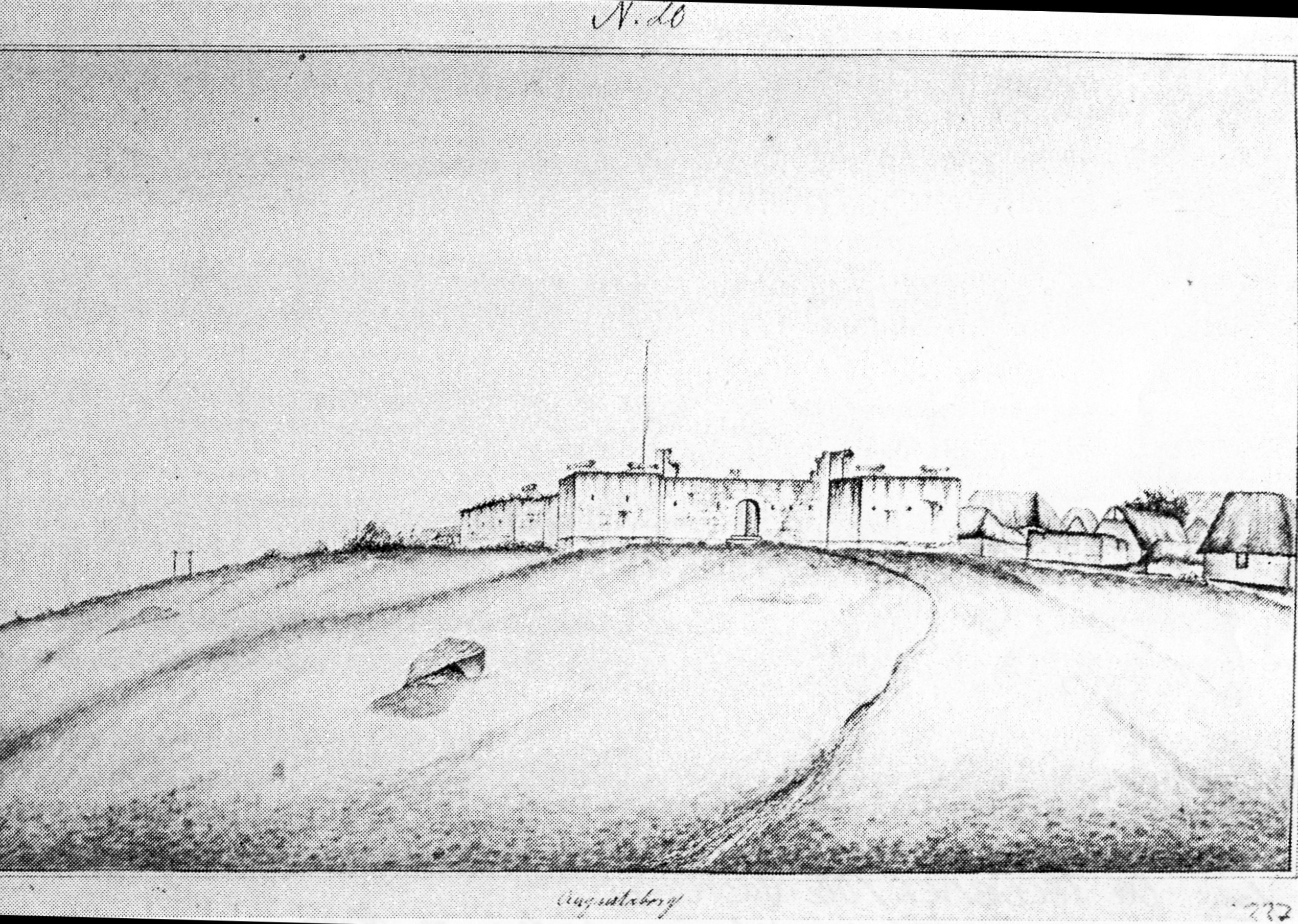
Fort Augustaborg, built 1787.

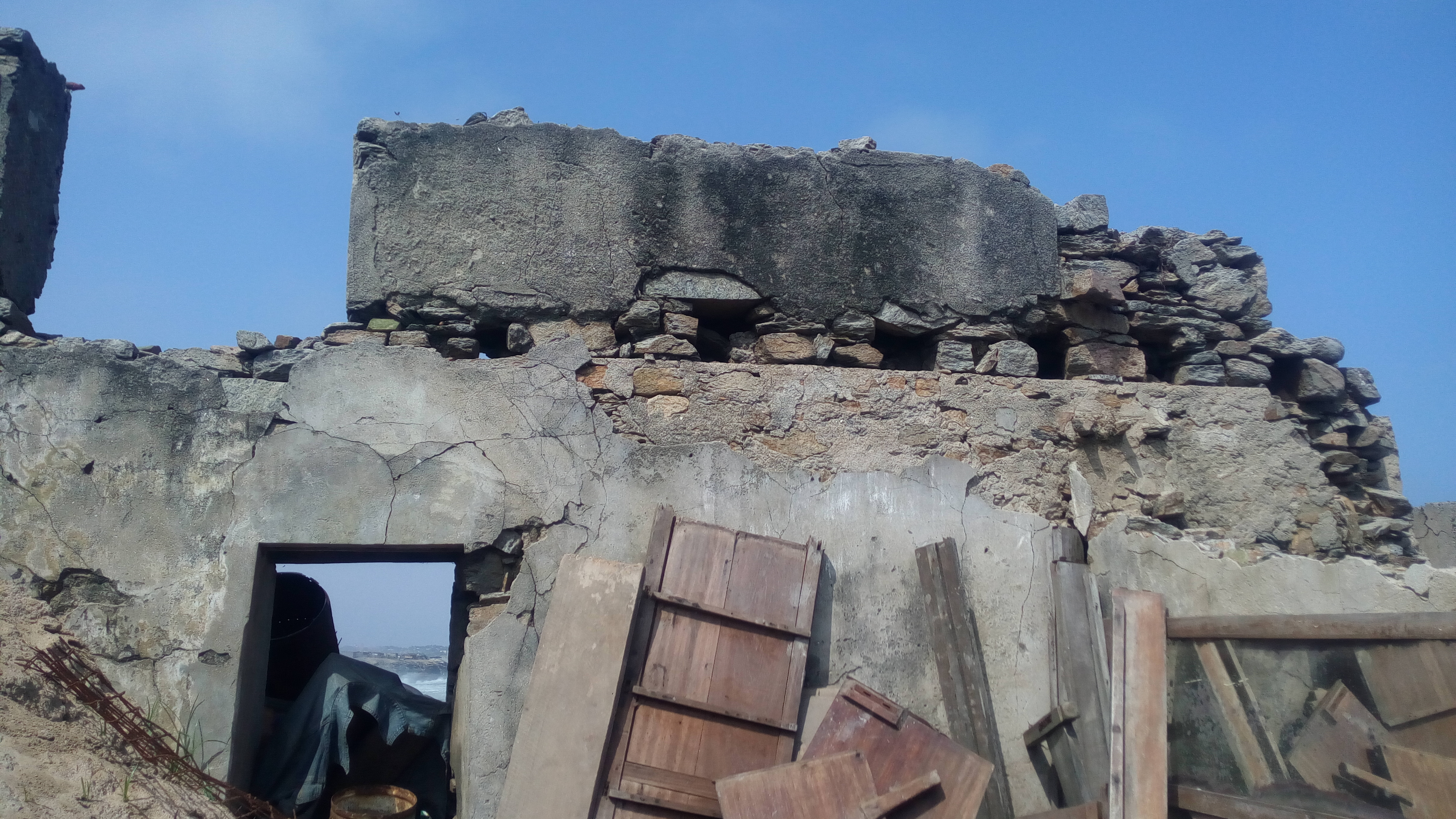
Ruins in 2016.

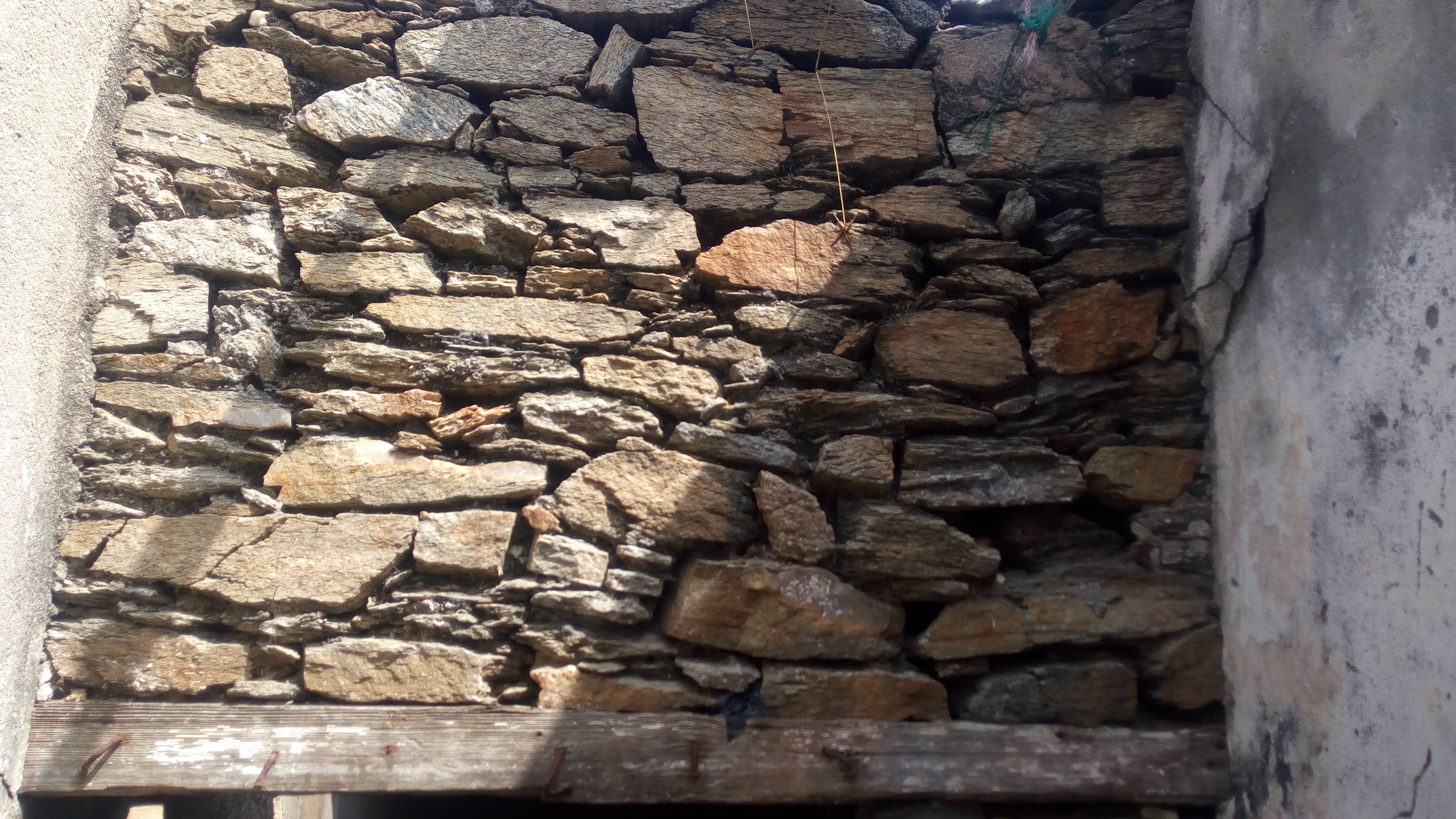
Wall in 2016.

== See also ==
- List of castles in Ghana
