= Fort Kongenstein =

Danish trading fort

- Ada Foah, Ghana
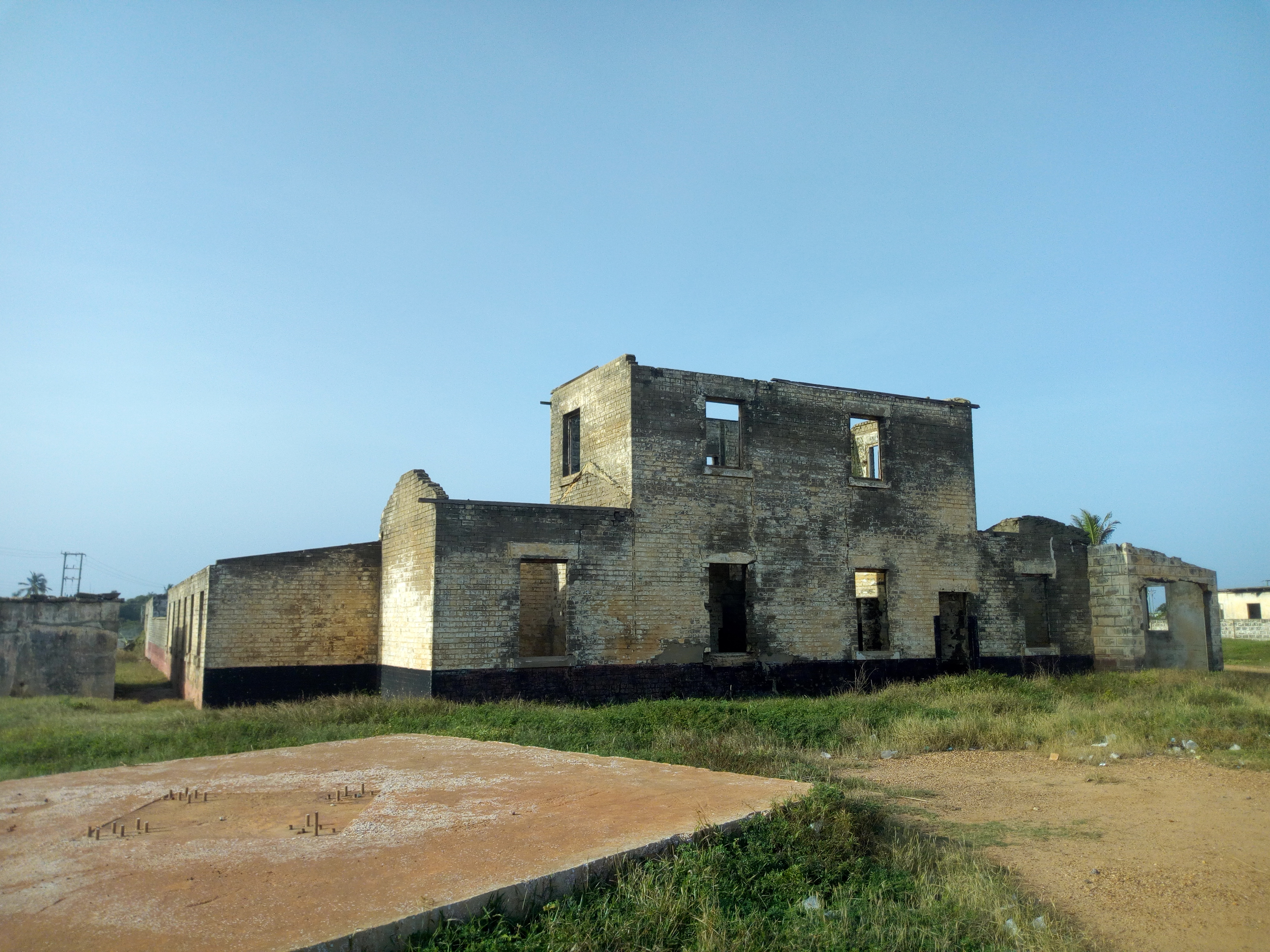
- Remains of Fort Kongenstein

Site information
- Condition: ruins

Location
- Coordinates: 5°47′N 0°38′E

Site history
- Built: 1783
- Fate: washed away by the sea

Fort Kongenstein (Danish: Fort Kongensten) was a Danish trading fort located in Ada Foah, Ghana built in 1783. A greater portion of the fort has since been washed away by the sea waves.

== Gallery ==
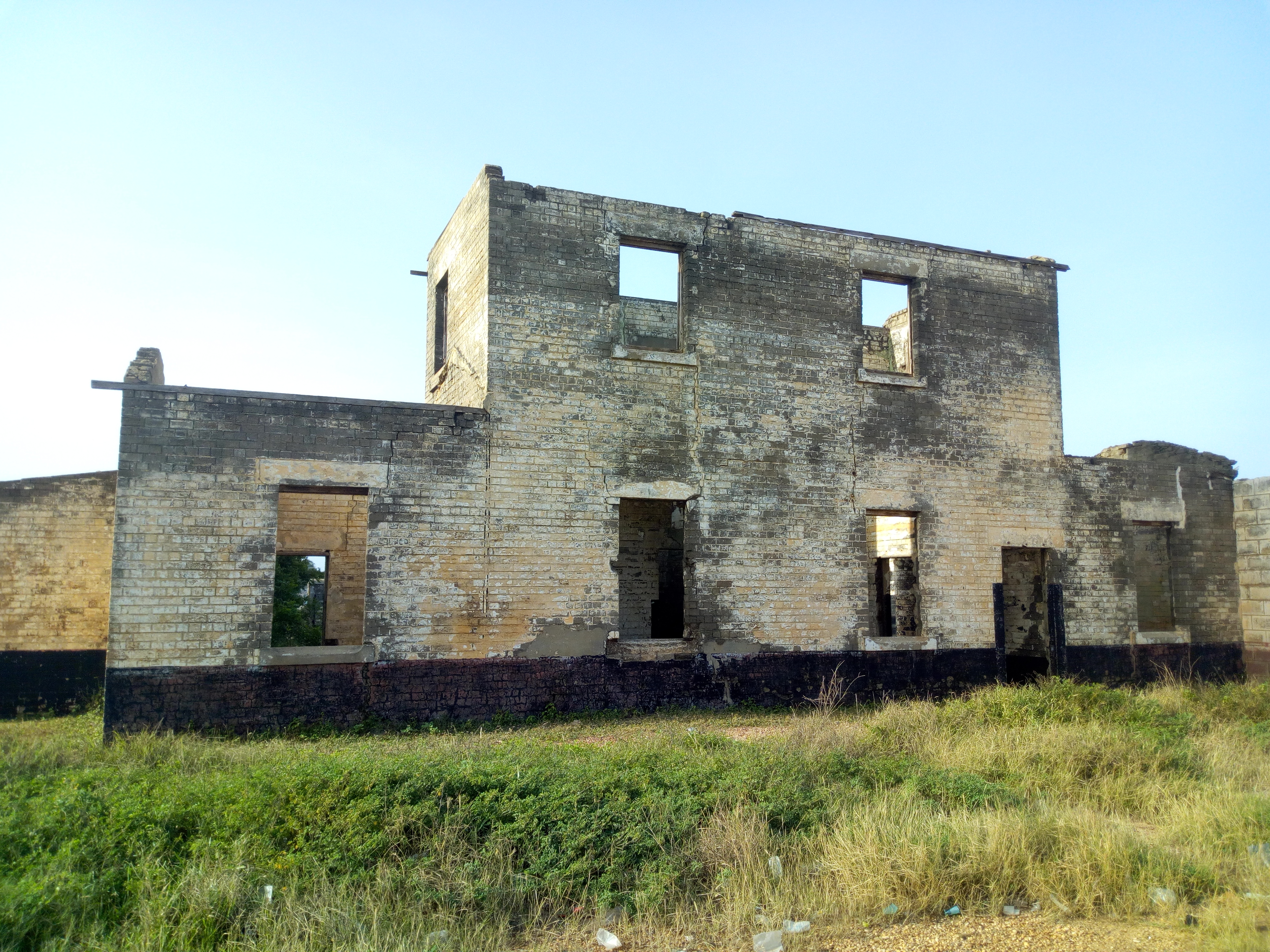
Front view

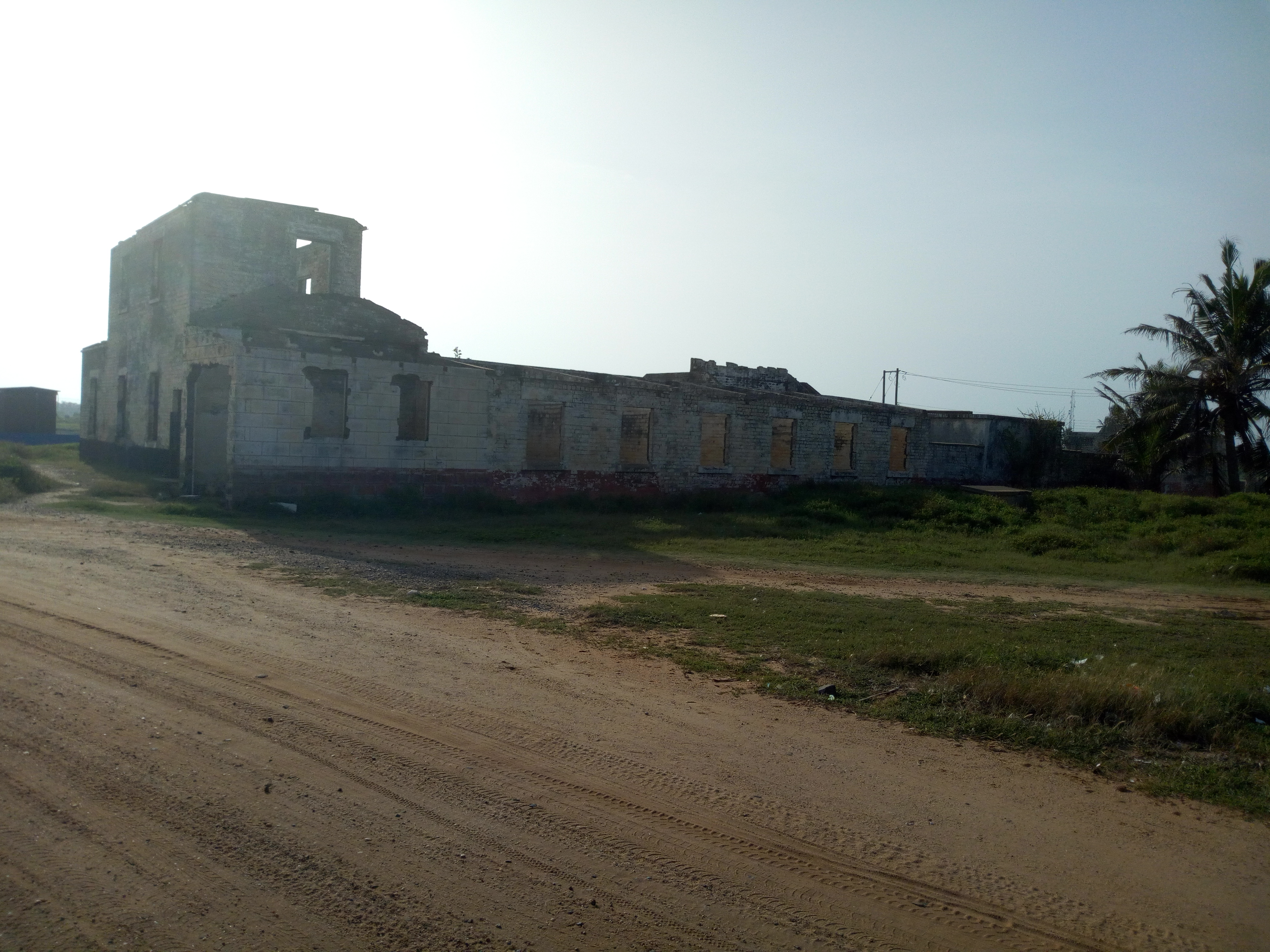
Front view

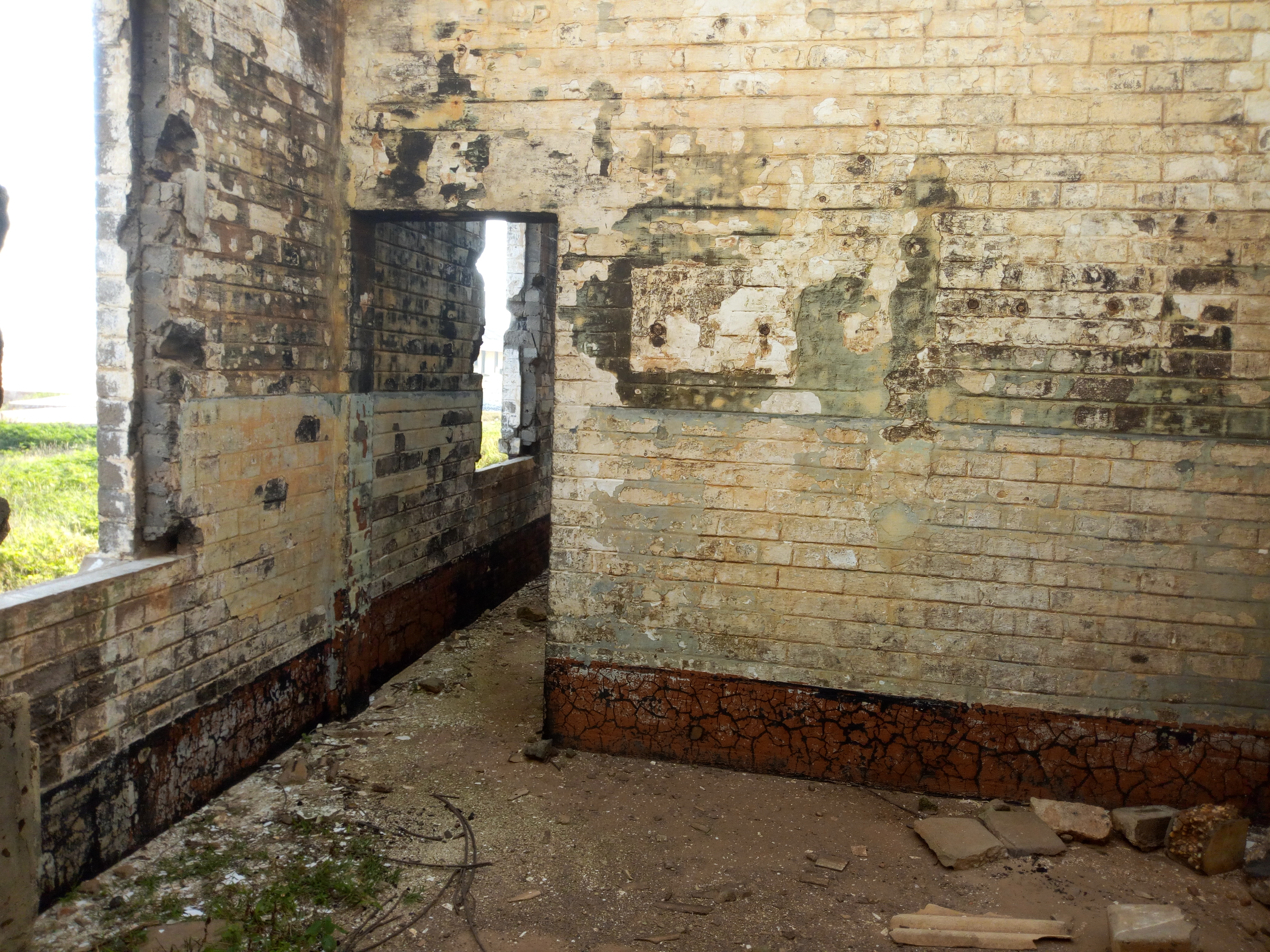

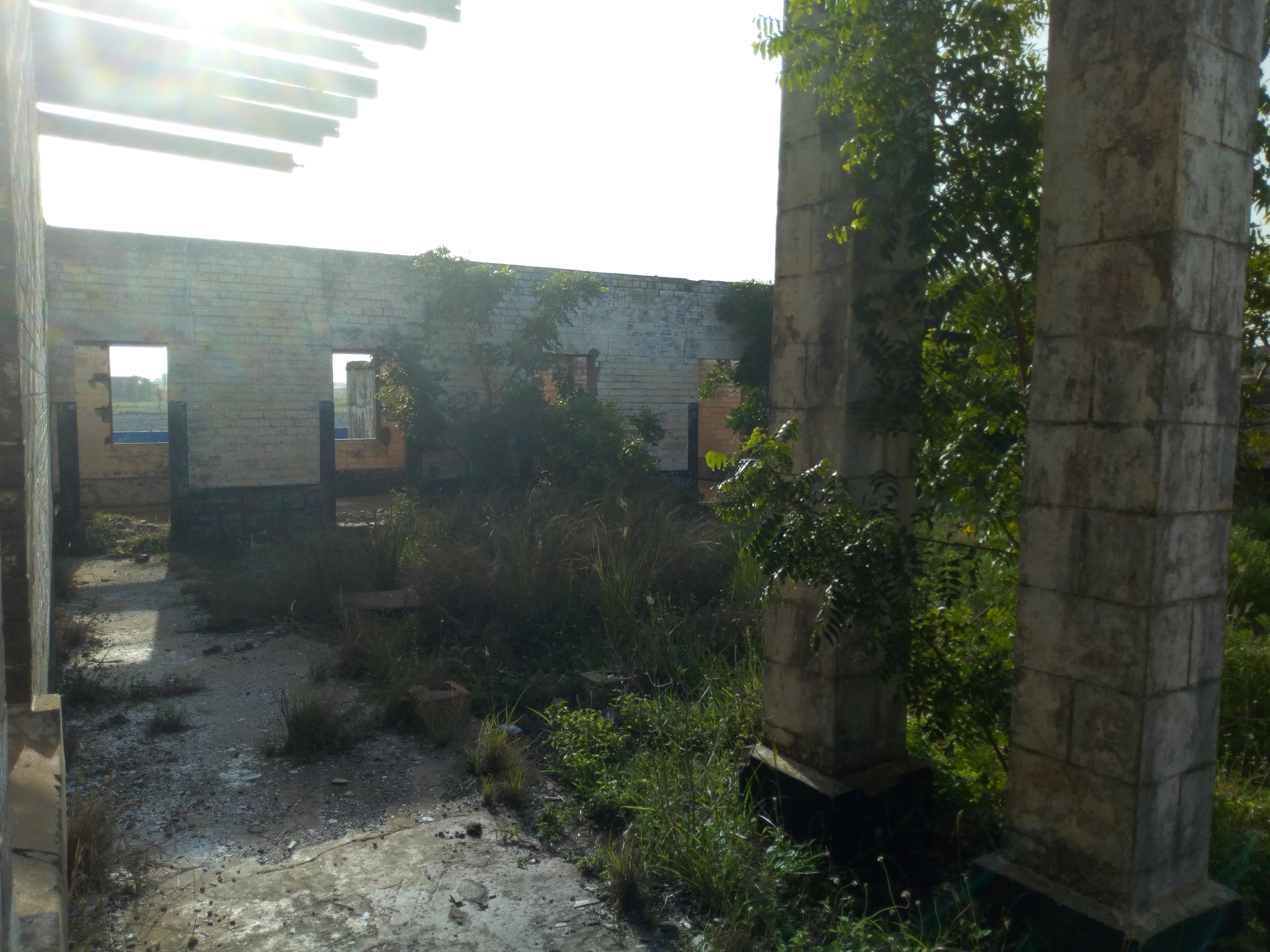

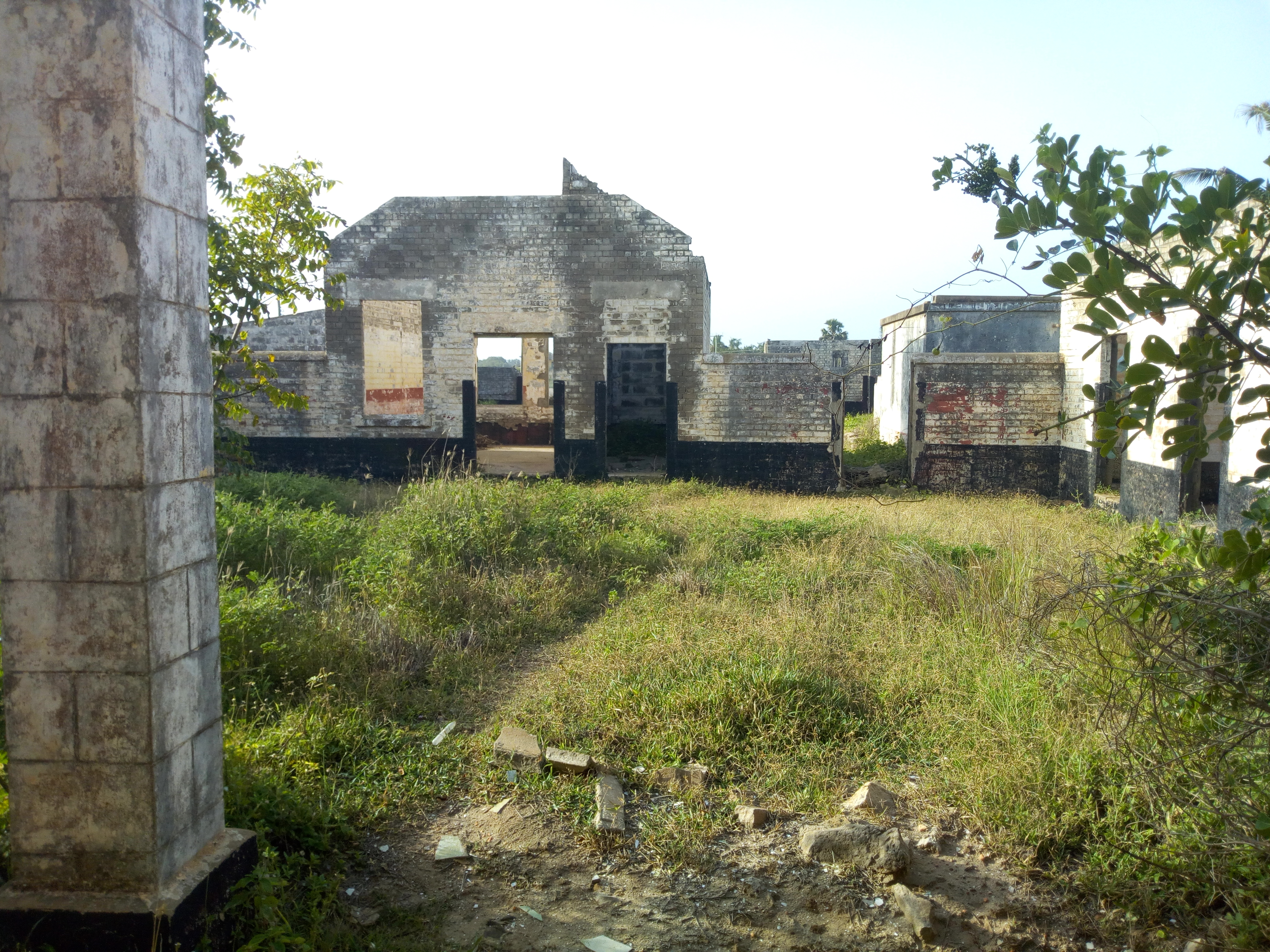
