= List of African territories and states by date of colonization =

This is a list of the dates when African states were made colonies or protectorates of European powers and lost their independence.

== List ==
Name	Year	Colonial power
Morocco	1912	France
Libya	1911	Italy
Fulani Empire	1903	France and the United Kingdom
Swaziland	1902	United Kingdom
Ashanti Confederacy	1900	United Kingdom
Burundi	1893	Germany
Nri Kingdom	1911	United Kingdom
Kingdom of Benin	1897	United Kingdom
Bunyoro	1899	United Kingdom
Dahomey	1894	France
Rwanda	1894	Germany
Oubangui-Chari	1894	France
Mthwakazi	1893	United Kingdom
Ijebu	1892	United Kingdom
Bechuanaland	1885	United Kingdom
Merina	1885	France
South Africa	1879	United Kingdom
Fante Confederacy	1874	United Kingdom
Basutoland	1868	United Kingdom
Tunisia	1881	France
Comoros	1843	France
Algeria	1830	France
Zanzibar	1503	Portugal
Nigeria	1861	United Kingdom
