= Fort Frederiksborg =

Ghanaian fort

- Part of Danish Gold Coast
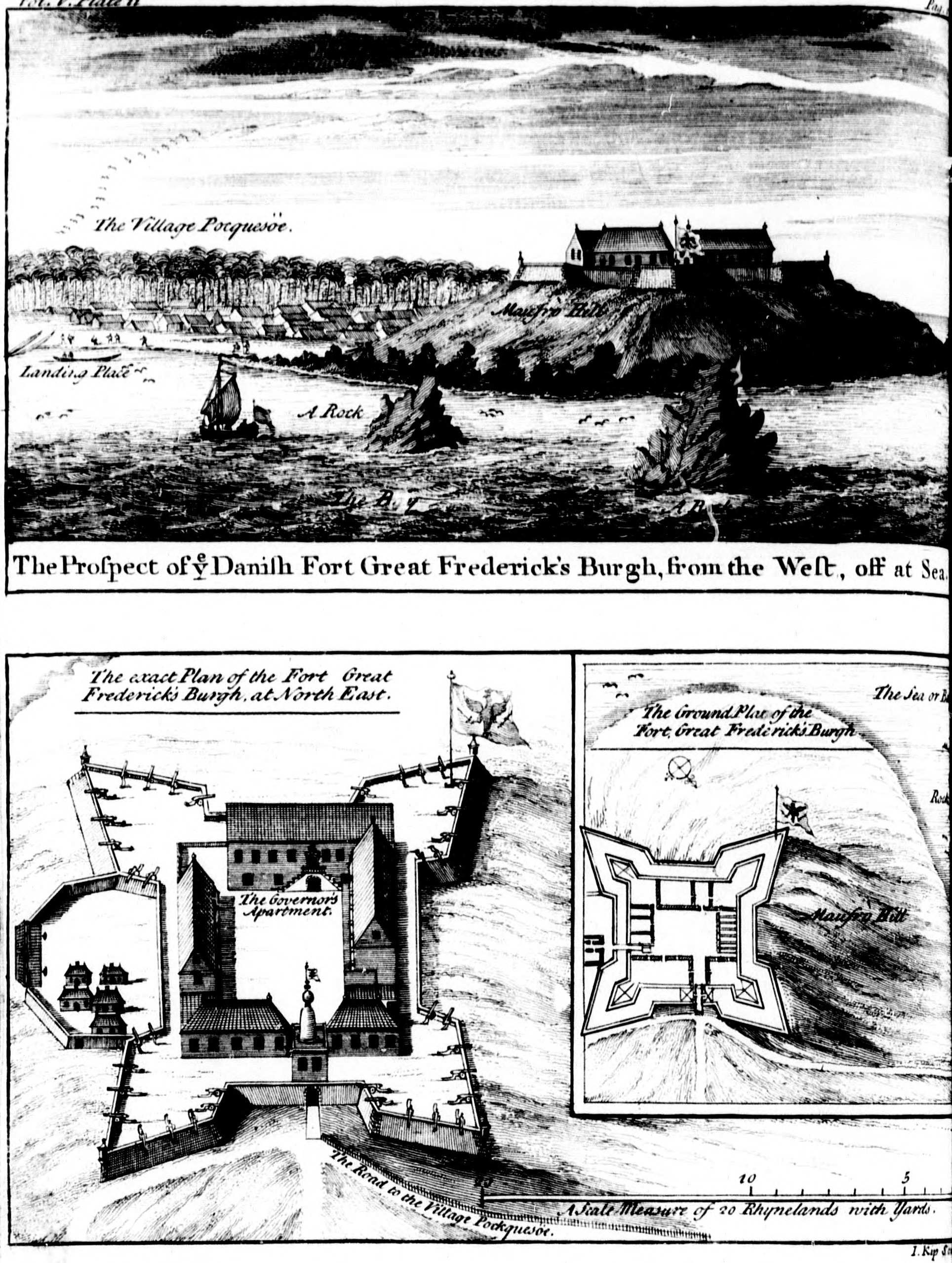
- Illustration from A Collection of Voyages and Travels Fort Frederiksborg (Ghana)

Site history
- Built: 1661

Garrison information
- Occupants: Denmark-Norway (1661-1679); England (1679-1700)

Fort Frederiksborg, later Fort Royal, was a Danish-Norwegian and later English fort on the Gold Coast in contemporary Ghana. It was built in 1661, with the approval of the King of Fetu, a few hundred yards from Cape Coast Castle, which was at that time in Swedish hands, on Amanfro Hill. Along with several other castles and forts nearby, Fort Frederiksborg was inscribed on the World Heritage List in 1979 because of its testimony to European economic influence on West Africa and the Atlantic slave trade.

== History ==
Frederiksborg was a small fort from which Cape Coast Castle could easily be bombarded. It functioned for a short time as the headquarters of the Danish West India Company on the Danish Gold Coast, before it was moved to Christiansborg Castle in Osu.

In 1665 the English Royal African Company took over Cape Coast Castle and reinforced it to use it as their new headquarters. The Danes had little use of their fort. The fort was first pawned to the English in 1679 before it was finally sold to them in 1685.

The English reconstructed the fort in 1699 and renamed it Fort Royal. They soon abandoned it again, however.

== Sources ==
- Van Dantzig, Albert (1999). Forts and Castles of Ghana. Accra: Sedco Publishing. ISBN 9964-72-010-6.
