= German Congo Expedition =

1880s expedition

The German Congo Expedition was conducted by the German African Association from 1884 to 1886.

The expedition left Hamburg in April 1884 under the command of Lieutenant Eduard Shulze. At Gabon, the botanist, Richard Büttner, was left to attend to the coffee plantation of Dr Soyaux
