= German attempts to colonise the Somali Coast =

German colonial attempt

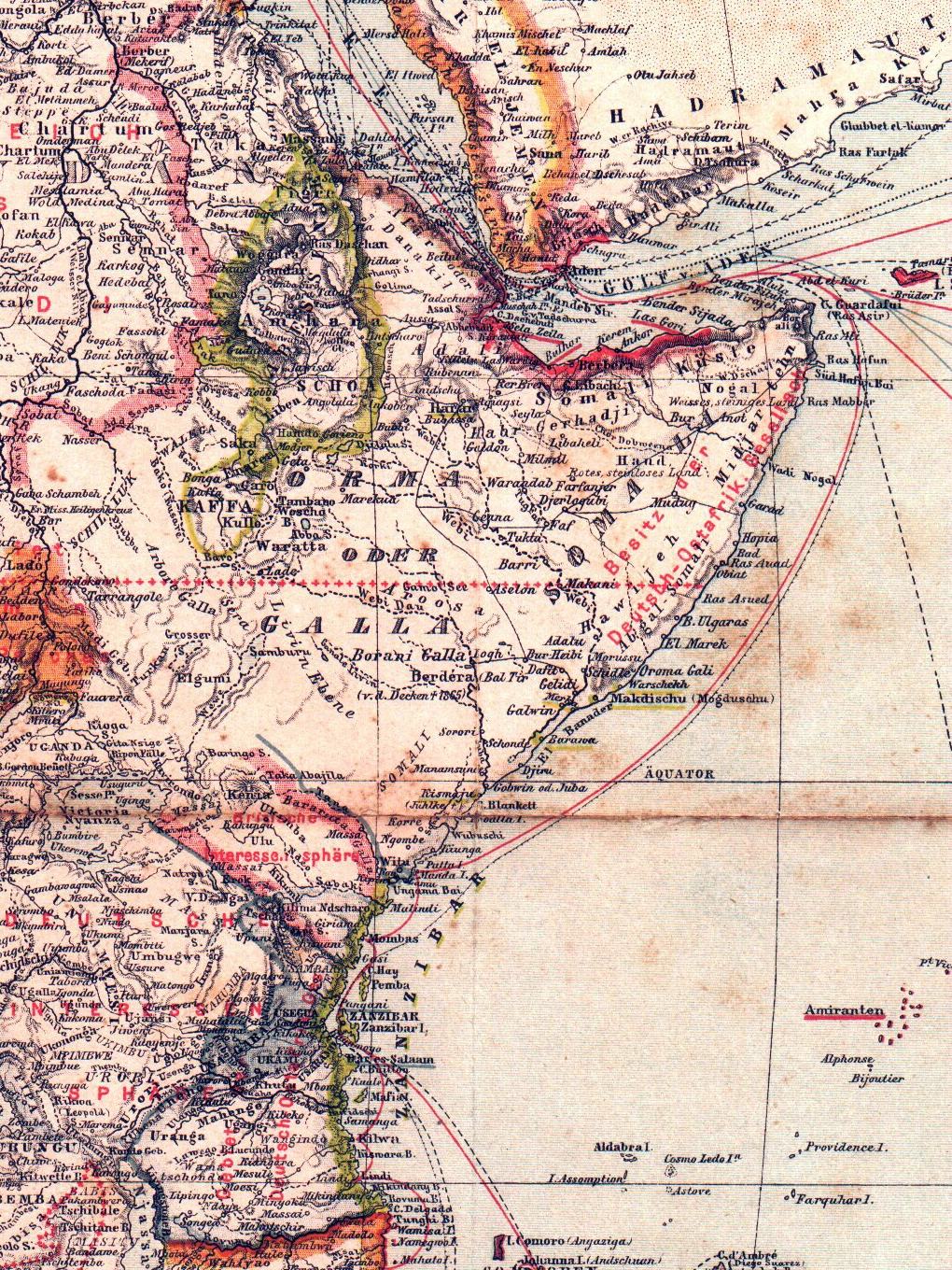
Areas of Somali coast labeled as property of German East Africa, 1887

German colonial efforts on the Somali coast were pursued from 1885 to 1890. Representatives of the German East Africa Company (DOAG) signed friendship and protection treaties with local rulers in the coastal cities of Somalia in 1885 and 1886 with the aim of acquiring areas north of Wituland. In 1888 and 1890, respectively, the project, which overlapped with British and Italian claims, was abandoned.

== Background and strategy ==
Cities of importance on the 1800s Somali coast were Mogadishu, Kismayo, Warsheikh, Merca and Barawe. They were primarily trading cities, as agriculture was hardly possible in the immediate vicinity due to the region's arid climate These port cities were under the rule of the Geledi Sultanate and the Hiraab Imamate. The British protectorate established in 1884 over the Northern Somali Coast in turn, troubled the Majerteen Sultans in present-day Puntland. The African researcher and later consul Friedrich Gerhard Rohlfs recommended German acquisitions on the Somali coast from 1882 in order to establish trade relations inland.

German colonial agents now tried on the one hand to provide Sultan Barghash bin Said of Zanzibar for the provision or to push the lease of its Somali coastal places, and on the other hand to conclude trade agreements and alliances against Zanzibar with the Somali sultans in the hinterland of these coastal places. However, the Italians also had similar plans.

== Northeast Somalia ==
The contracts concluded by representatives of society with Somali rulers should extend German East Africa to such an extent that it would have extended from the Rovuma River in the south along the entire East African coast to Cape Guardafui in the north. In February 1886, Carl Peters asked the German government for a protectorate for the entire Somali coast.

=== Hörnecke expedition in the Majerteen Sultanate ===
In Aluula, near Cape Guardafui, an expedition group led by the government builder Gustav Hörnecke closed on 6 September 1885 a far-reaching friendship agreement with the local Sultan Bogor Osman Mahmoud Yusuf (1854–1927) from the Majerteen clan, who belonged to the Darod clan.

The contract drawn up in German and Arabic (not in Somali) shows significant differences between the two language versions. While the German text refers to a protection treaty with the German Empire and land transfers to the German-East African Society, the Arabic text only mentions a treaty on friendship and support for the society in the research and utilization of the hinterland.

The area of Sultan Osman affected by the treaty should extend from cape westwards to Bender Ziada, about 400 kilometers east of Berbera, and southwards to Cape Ras Assuad (near Hobyo, in the Mudug region). However, according to the German version, the contract area extended to the gates of the already British Berbera. Inland, the contract area would each extend 20 day trips (i.e. about 600 kilometers deep and thus into Ogaden).

=== Anderten expedition in the Sultanate of Hobyo ===
While Hörnecke returned to Berlin after concluding the contract via Aden and Trieste and two DOAG employees tried in vain to establish the contractually promised branch in Caluula, Hörnecke's adjutant, Lieutenant Claus von Anderten, had been commissioned to expand the contract area to the south.

With Osman's relative, Yusuf Ali Kenadid of Hobyo, Anderten closed the agreement on 26 November 1885, the German and Arabic versions of which differed similarly significantly. According to this follow-up contract, the Sultan subordinated the coastal area of the Abgal clan belonging to the Hawiya tribe south of Hobyo to the gates of Warsheikh (i.e. to about 80 kilometers north of Mogadishu). Inland, a length of 25 day trips to the borders of the Oromia area was planned this time (i.e. about 750 kilometers and thus deep again into Ogaden).
