= Osu Castle =

Colonial fort in Ghana

Coordinates: 5°32′49″N 0°10′57″W

- Part of the Danish Gold Coast
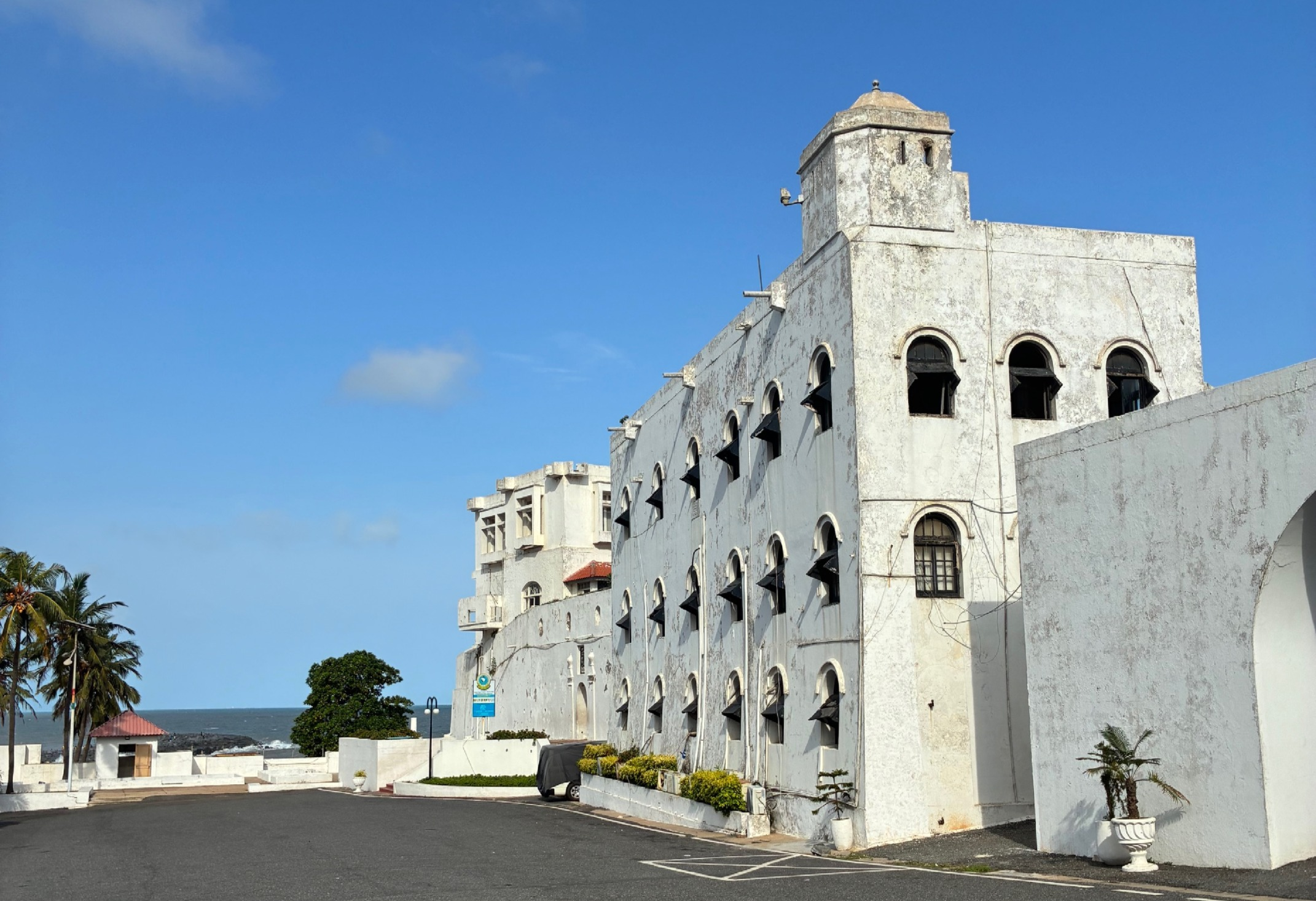
- Osu Castle

Location
- Location within Ghana

Site history
- Built: 1661; 365 years ago

Garrison information
- Occupants: Denmark–Norway (1660)

UNESCO World Heritage Site
- Part of: Forts and Castles, Volta, Greater Accra, Central and Western Regions
- Criteria: Cultural: (vi)
- Inscription: 1979 (3rd Session)

Osu Castle (also known as Fort Christiansborg or Christiansborg Castle) is a castle located in Osu, a neighborhood of Accra, the capital city of Ghana, on the coast of the Gulf of Guinea.

A substantial fort was built by Denmark–Norway in the 1660s; thereafter, the fort changed ownership between Denmark–Norway, Portugal, the Akwamu, Britain, and finally post-Independence Ghana. Under Denmark–Norway control it was the capital of the Danish Gold Coast, and held and dispatched enslaved people overseas.

In 1902, Christiansborg Castle (as it then was) became the seat of government in the Gold Coast; however, in modern Ghana, the seat of government has now been moved to Jubilee House.

Because of its testimony to European colonial influence in West Africa and the Atlantic slave trade, the castle was inscribed on the UNESCO World Heritage List in 1979 along with several other castles and forts in Ghana.

== History ==
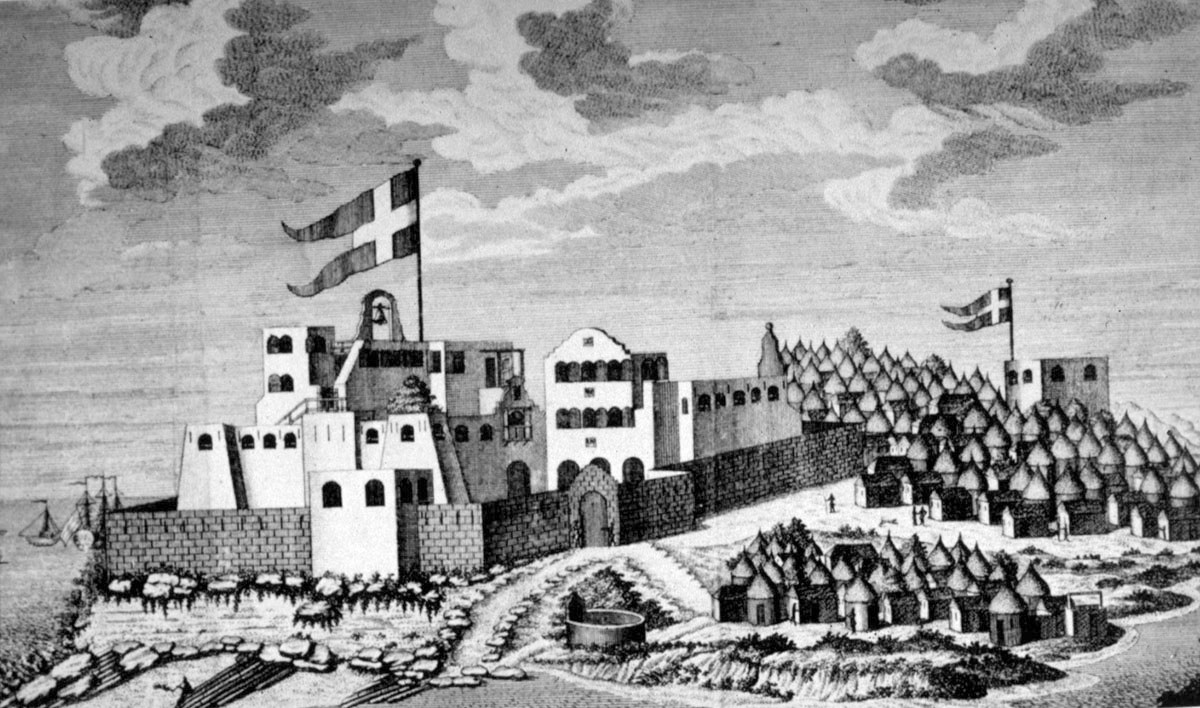
Contemporary illustration of Fort Christiansborg and Fort Prøvestenen

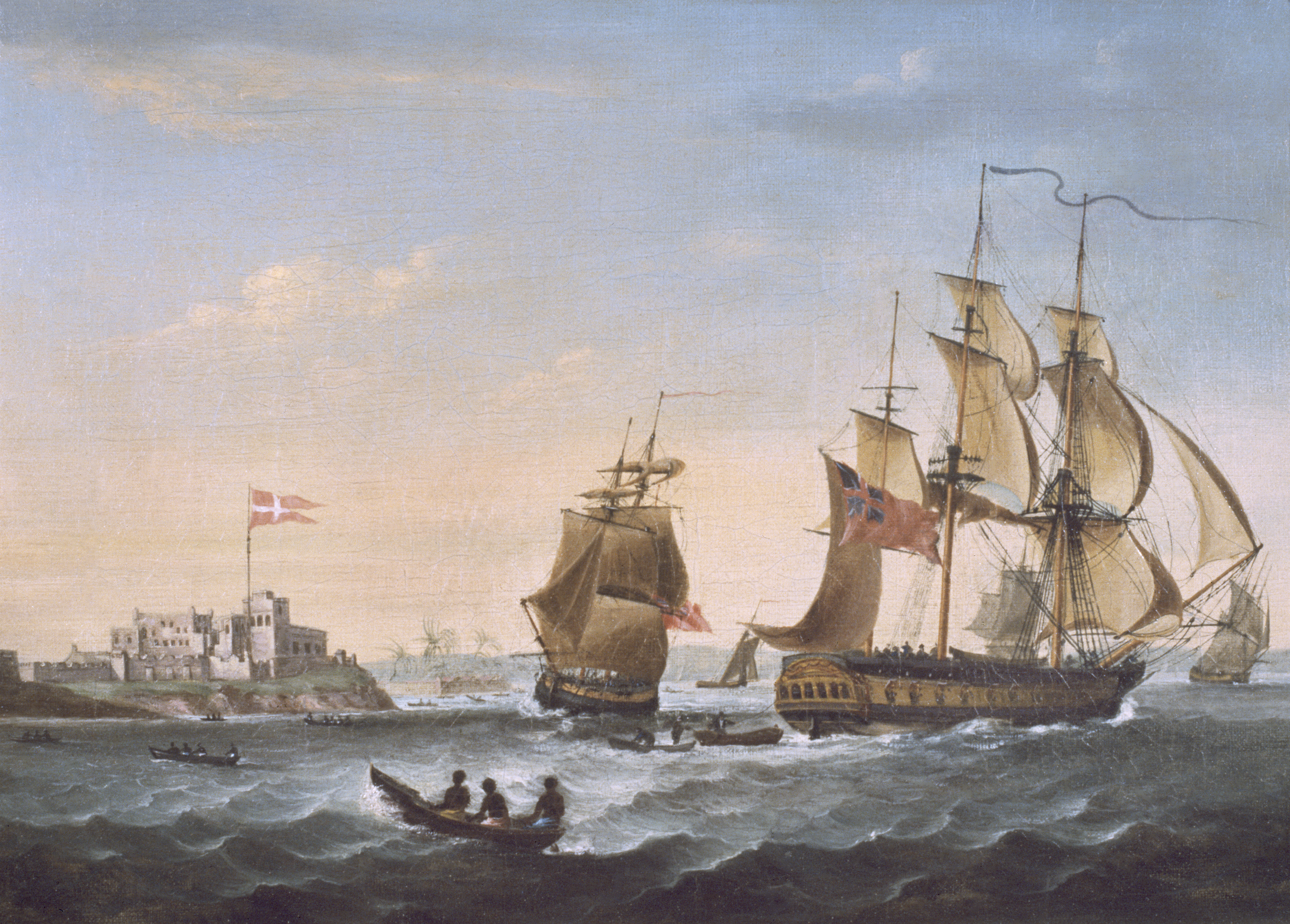
c. 1800 painting of two British slave ships off Fort Christiansborg

The area was first occupied in 1550 by the Portuguese, though in the 17th century Portuguese influence diminished. The area came under the control of Sweden in the late 1640s, led by the German trader Heinrich Carloff. In 1652, he was given permission to build a small fortified lodge by the King of Accra, with whom he had previously done business. In 1660, control passed to the Netherlands but it was soon lost to Denmark–Norway. In 1657, Carloff had again traveled to Africa, this time representing Denmark–Norway. He aimed to conquer the forts he had previously established, which he found easy at Osu. In its early life, the castle was primarily used in the gold and ivory trade, but under Dano-Norwegian control it increasingly dealt with slaves.

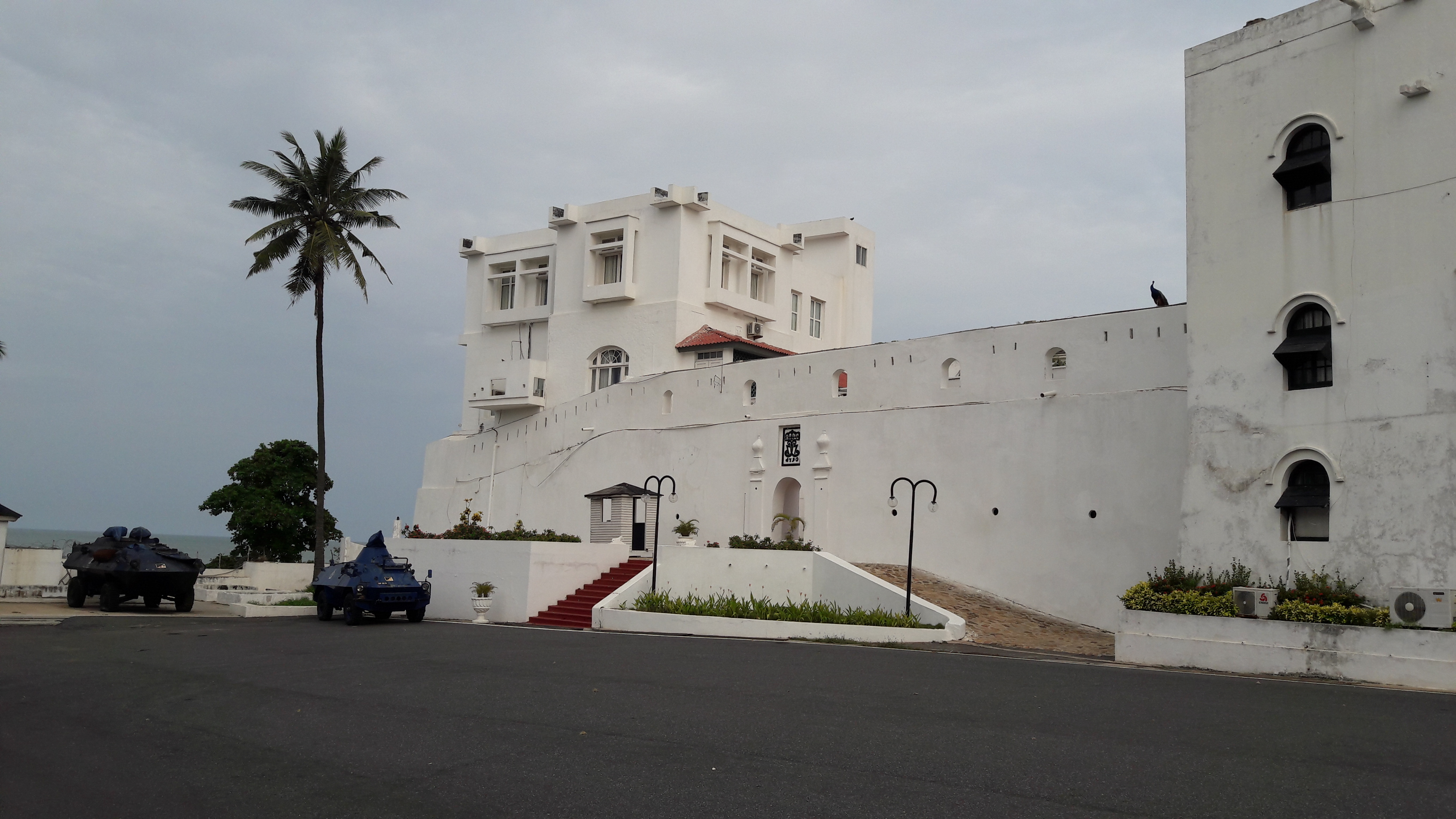
Osu Castle's entrance in 2017

Osu Castle was located close to two other forts. Fort Crèvecœur was controlled by the Dutch and Fort James by the British. The settlement at Osu was too small to store sufficient goods to compete with the others. Consequently, Denmark–Norway purchased adjoining land and expanded the building, naming it Fort Christiansborg after the reigning Danish King Christian V. This is not to be confused with the slightly later royal palace in Copenhagen. Denmark–Norway would occupy the fort for most of the next 200 years, with some interruptions, and for much of that time it served as the capital of the Gold Coast of Denmark–Norway.

In 1679 or 1680, the fort's Greek assistant commander incited a mutiny to murder the commander. Shortly after that, a Portuguese ship commanded by Julião de Campos Barreto visited the fort and agreed to purchase it. The fort was named Fort São Francisco Xavier after the Catholic missionary Francis Xavier. The Portuguese built a chapel and raised the bastions by three feet. The fort was abandoned on 29 August 1682 after the garrison mutinied and it became clear that Portuguese traders could not compete with the other Gold Coast powers. Danish forces returned in February 1683 after purchasing the fort back from the Portuguese. In 1685, Fort Christiansborg became the capital of the Gold Coast of Denmark–Norway, taking over from Fort Frederiksborg.

The Akwamu ethnic group occupied the fort in 1693 after overpowering the occupants (who were reduced by death and disease) while disguised as merchants. Assameni, the Akwamu leader, occupied the fort for a year, trading with merchants from many nations. In 1694, Assameni sold the fort back to Denmark–Norway for 50 marks of gold (400 troy ounces, worth £200,000 to £250,000 in 2008) but retained the keys, which are still in the ethnic group's possession to this day. The early 18th century was not kind to the fort, and in 1722 the English reported it to be in disrepair. Extensions were made later that century, however, and structural improvements were made in 1824. The additional store rooms, garrison quarters, platforms, bastions and houses resulted in the castle being four times the size of the original fort. In the 1770s, the Danes at Osu became involved in a conflict with Dutch-controlled Accra.

In 1850, the British bought all of Denmark's Gold Coast possessions for £10,000 (between £850,000 and £1.5m in 2007), including Fort Christiansborg. Denmark had been considering selling these outposts for some time. After the slave trade had been abolished they were expensive to run and brought little benefit. Britain experienced the same problems, but was keen to prevent illegal slave trading and France or Belgium strengthening in the area. An earthquake in 1862 destroyed most of the upper floors, which were rebuilt in wood. Later that century, the castle became the seat of the colonial government. It was abandoned by the British colonial powers from 1890 to 1901. Within this period, it was used as a constabulary mess and later a psychiatric asylum. It became the seat of government again in 1902. In 1950, the wooden upper floors were rebuilt according to the original Danish plans. In 1957, when Ghana became independent, with Queen Elizabeth II as head of state, the fort became Government House, the residence of the Governor-General of Ghana. When Ghana became a republic in 1960, it became the residence of Ghana's first president, Kwame Nkrumah.

In 2005, there was debate over whether Osu Castle should be replaced as the seat of government. President John Kufuor argued that his government should not sit at the castle due to its previous association with slavery and also because its facilities were inadequate. National Democratic Congress MPs, however, argued that the $50 m that a new presidential palace would cost would be better spent elsewhere.

== Features ==
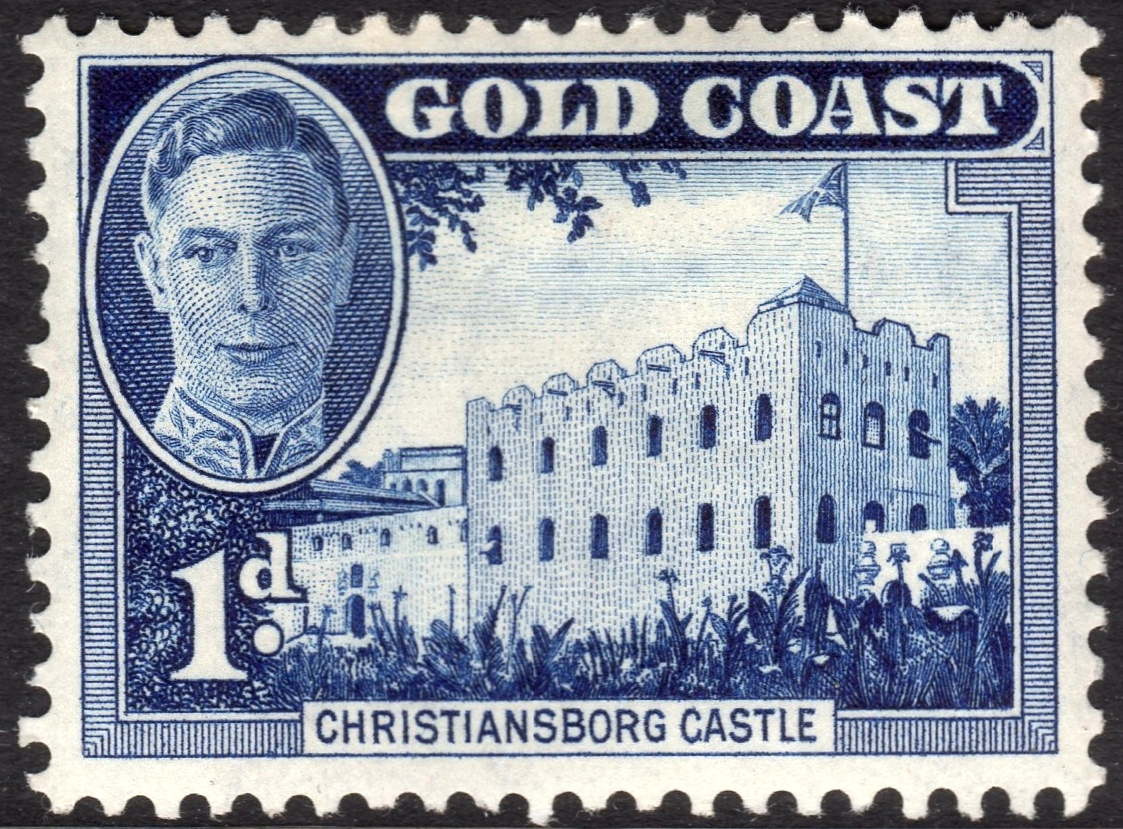
A 1948 stamp of The Gold Coast (modern Ghana) showing the castle under its former name.

Osu Castle is no longer the seat of government. The seat of government is now Jubilee House. This name is now gazetted after being changed from its former name, Flagstaff House. Many international dignitaries have visited the castle while in the region, including U.S. Presidents Richard Nixon, Bill Clinton, Barack Obama and German Chancellor Gerhard Schröder. Additional rooms were built in order to accommodate Queen Elizabeth II's visit in 1961, one year after Ghana became a republic.

The present castle is made up of various extensions to the original and is thus in an unorthodox shape. It has many facilities for the use of employees, including a clinic, café, shopping centre and a post office. It also still accommodates a permanent garrison. The extensive gardens feature a wide variety of plants, both local and imported, and employ 30 people. They are used for the president's outdoor receptions and parties. The Castle is closed to walk-in visitors.

== Controversies ==
In 2007, the opposition Members of Parliament (MPs) in Ghana (the National Democratic Congress, NDC) stormed out of a parliamentary debate on whether to take out a $50m loan to build a new presidential palace. MPs from President John Agyekum Kufuor's New Patriotic Party voted unanimously in favour of taking the loan from India. They argued that the president of the republic should not be based in Osu Castle, where slaves used to be kept.

The opposition National Democratic Congress said the money would be better spent such as improving the economy and helping promote the Better Ghana Agenda. This led to the then general secretary to the opposition NDC to describe the new Flagstaff House as a "hen coop only fit for rearing chicken". The old Flagstaff House used by Ghana's first president as his residence is being renovated into a museum, with the grounds on which it stands being built up as an ultra-modern office complex and residence for the president of Ghana and vice-president of Ghana as well as their staff.

== Gallery ==
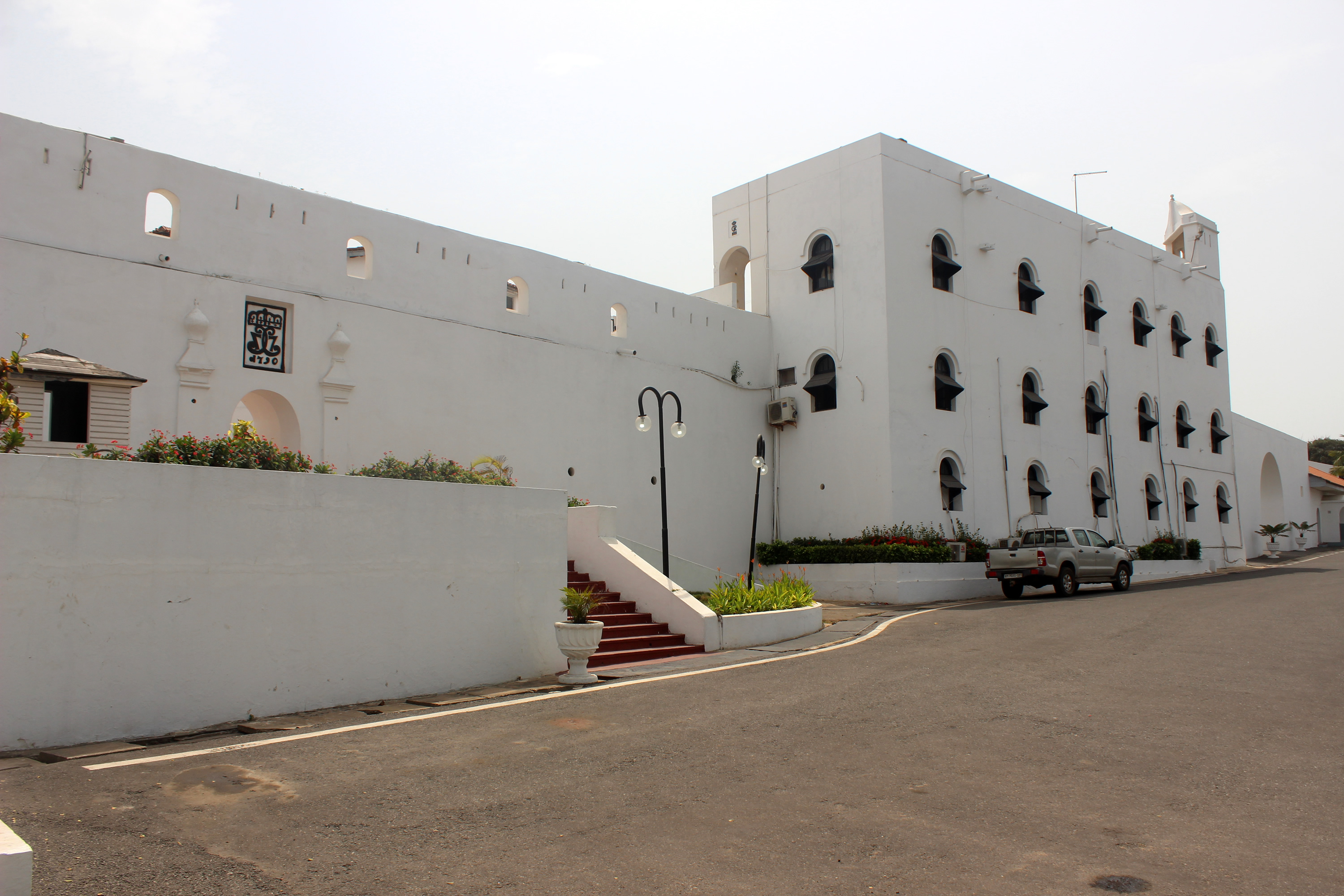
Osu Castle, also known as Fort Christiansborg, is a castle located in Accra.

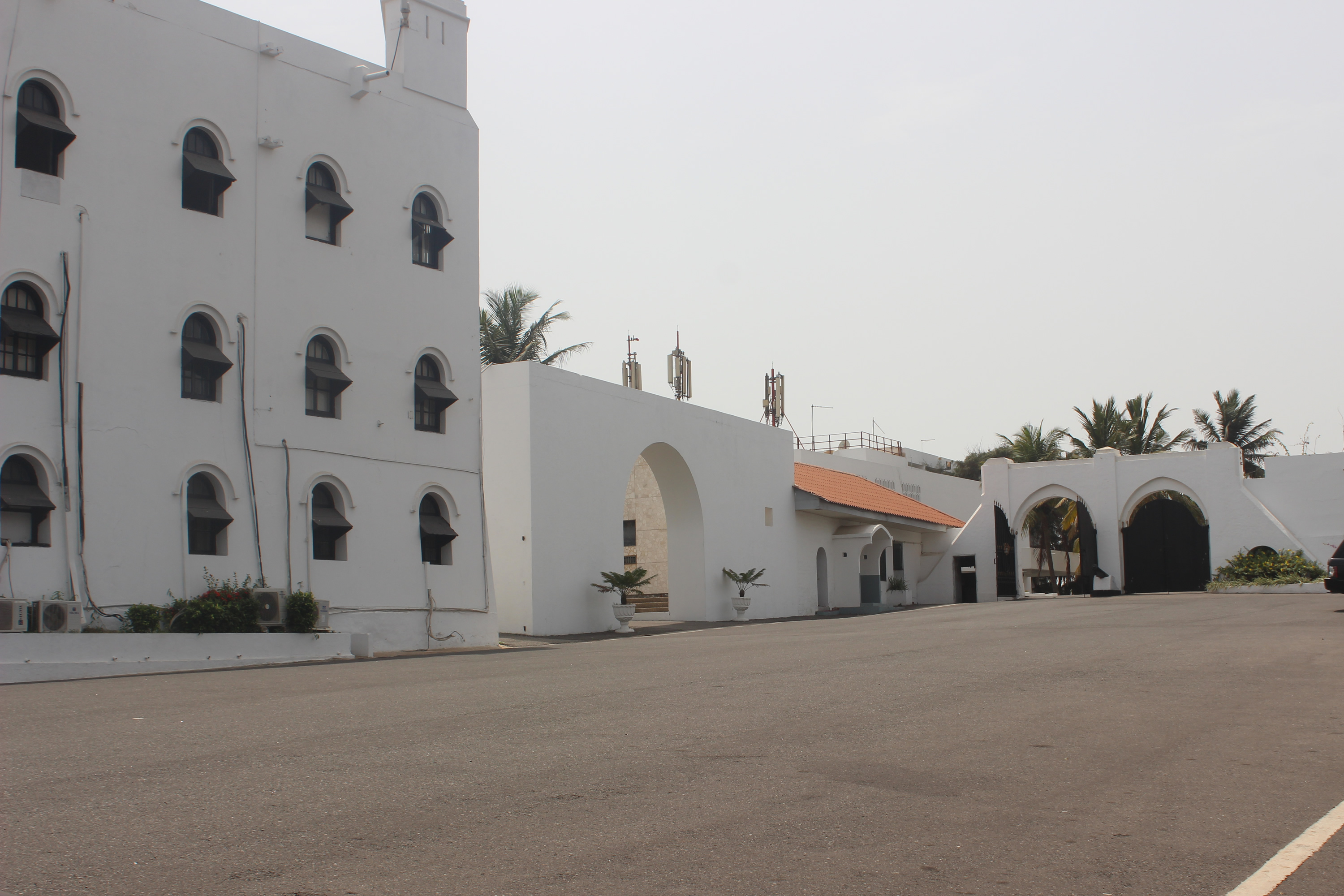
Osu Castle, also known as Fort Christiansborg, is a castle located in Accra.

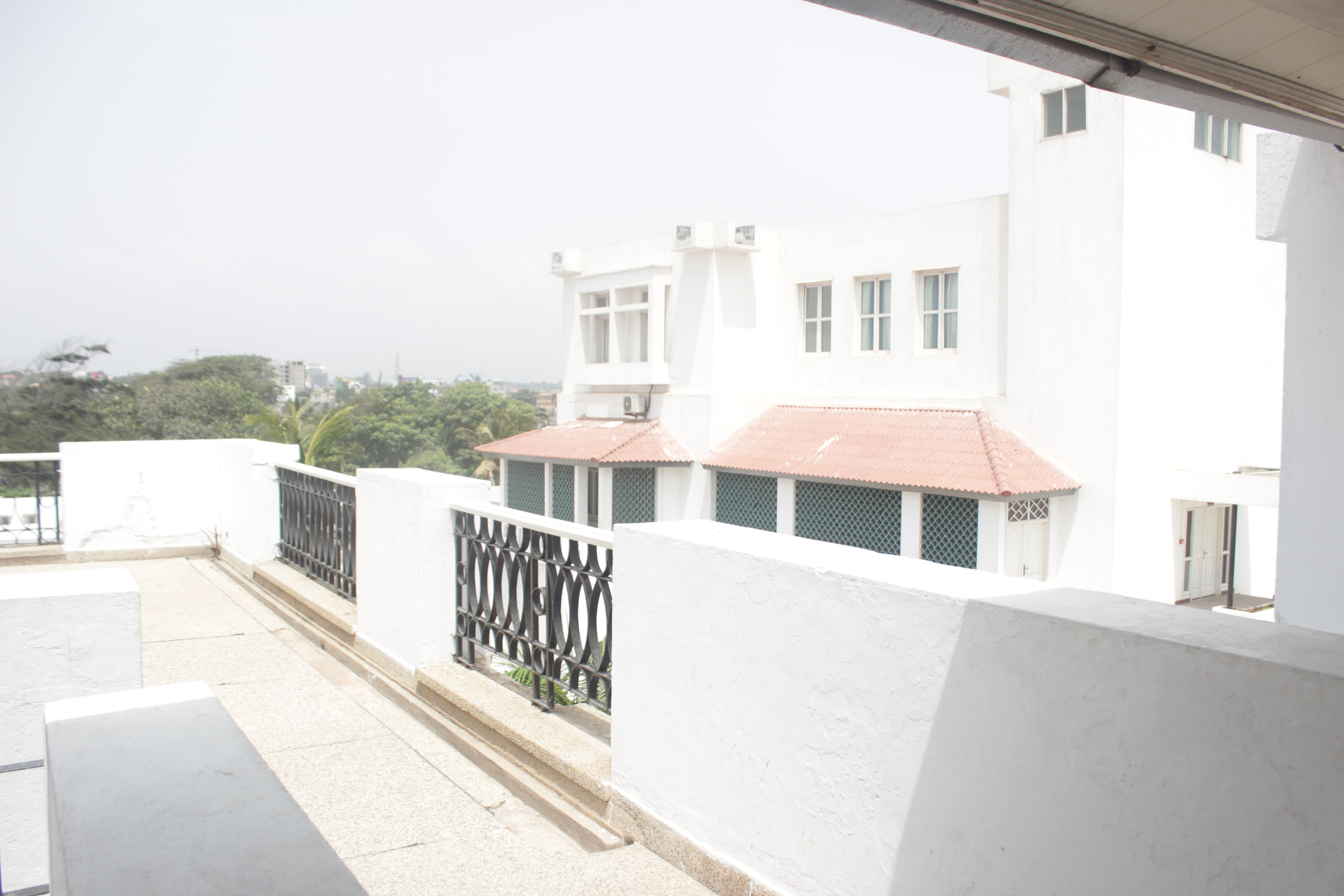
Osu Castle, also known as Fort Christiansborg, is a castle located in Accra.

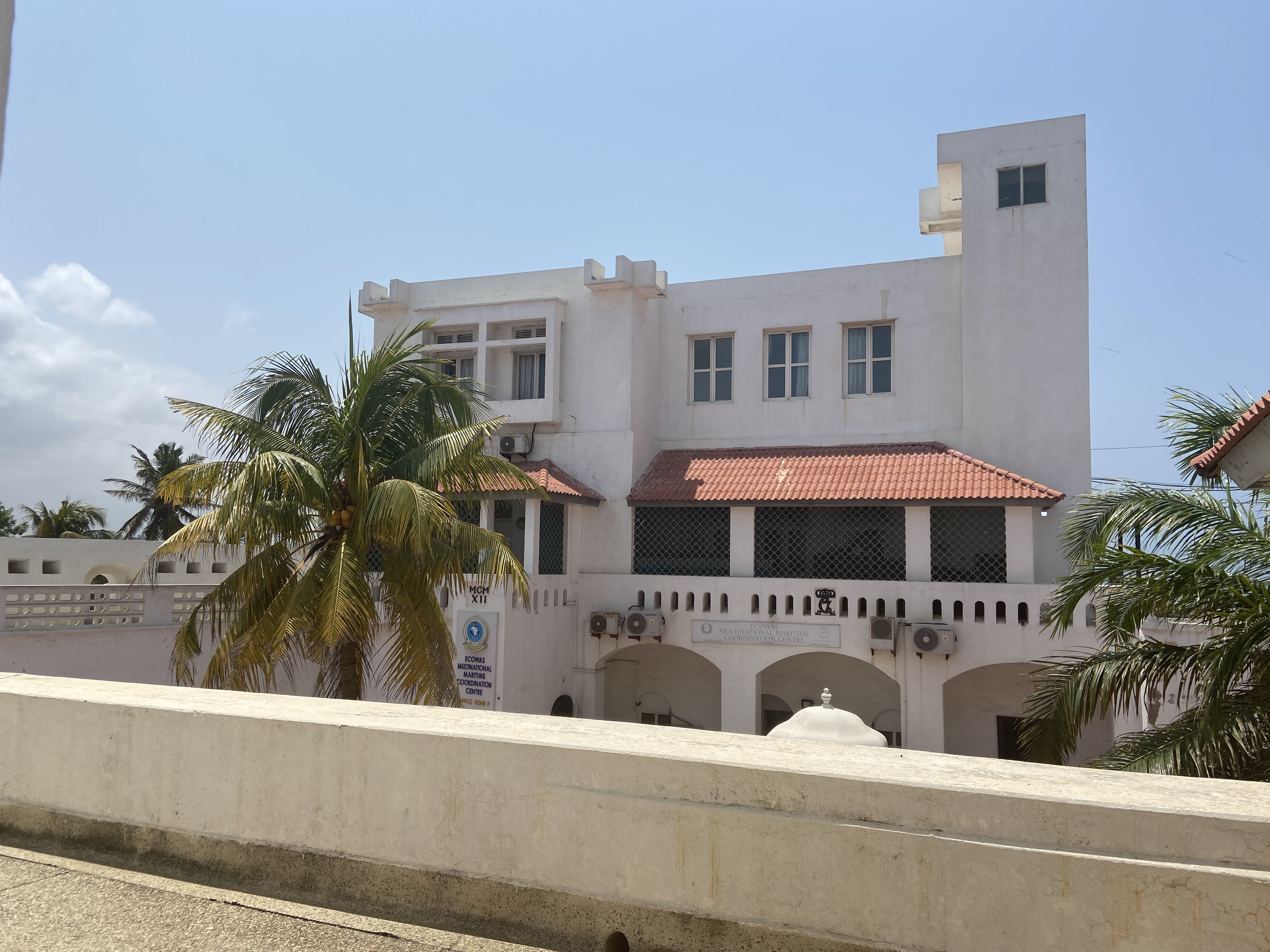
Christianborg Castle, Ghana

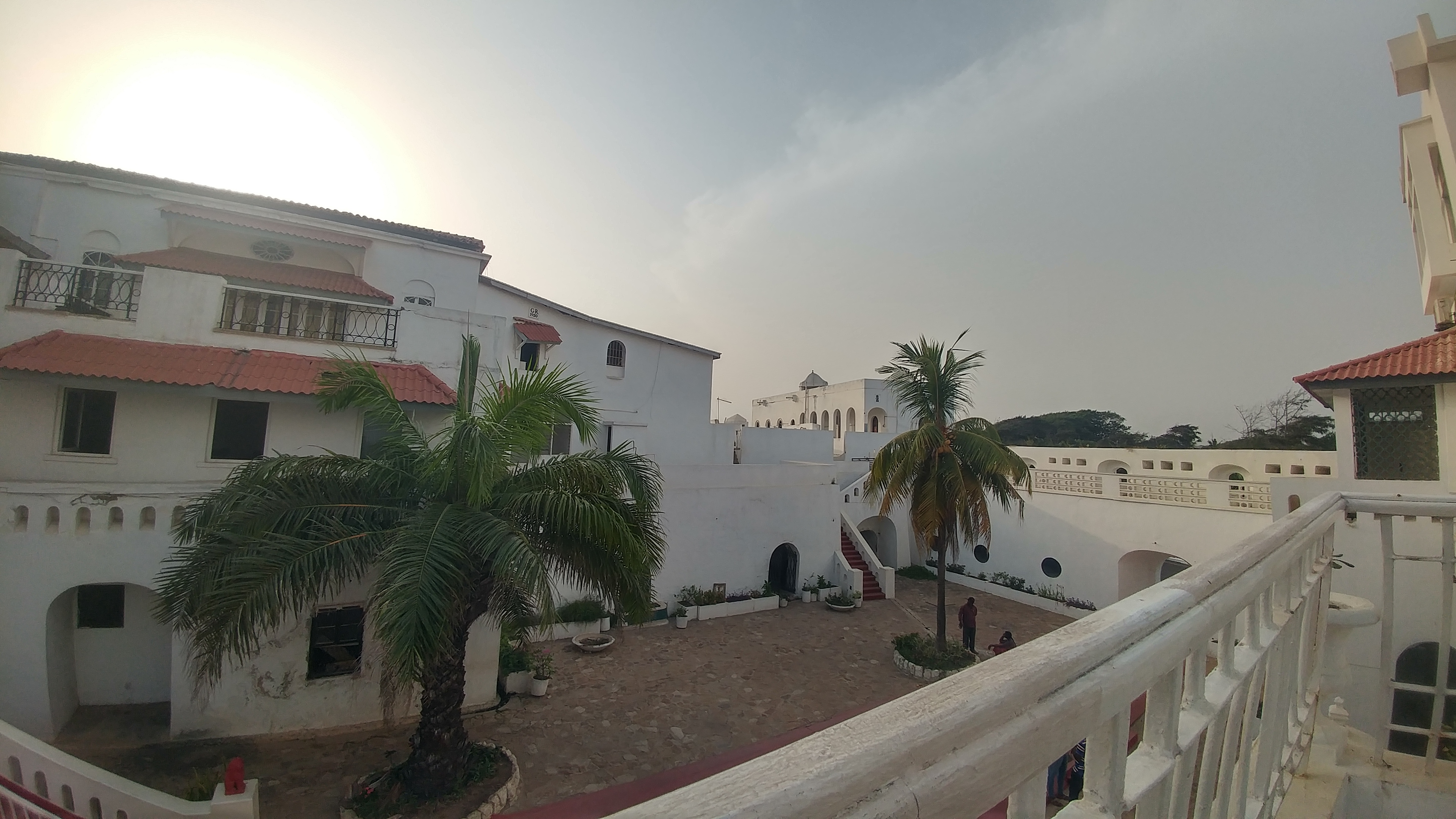
Christianborg Castle, Ghana

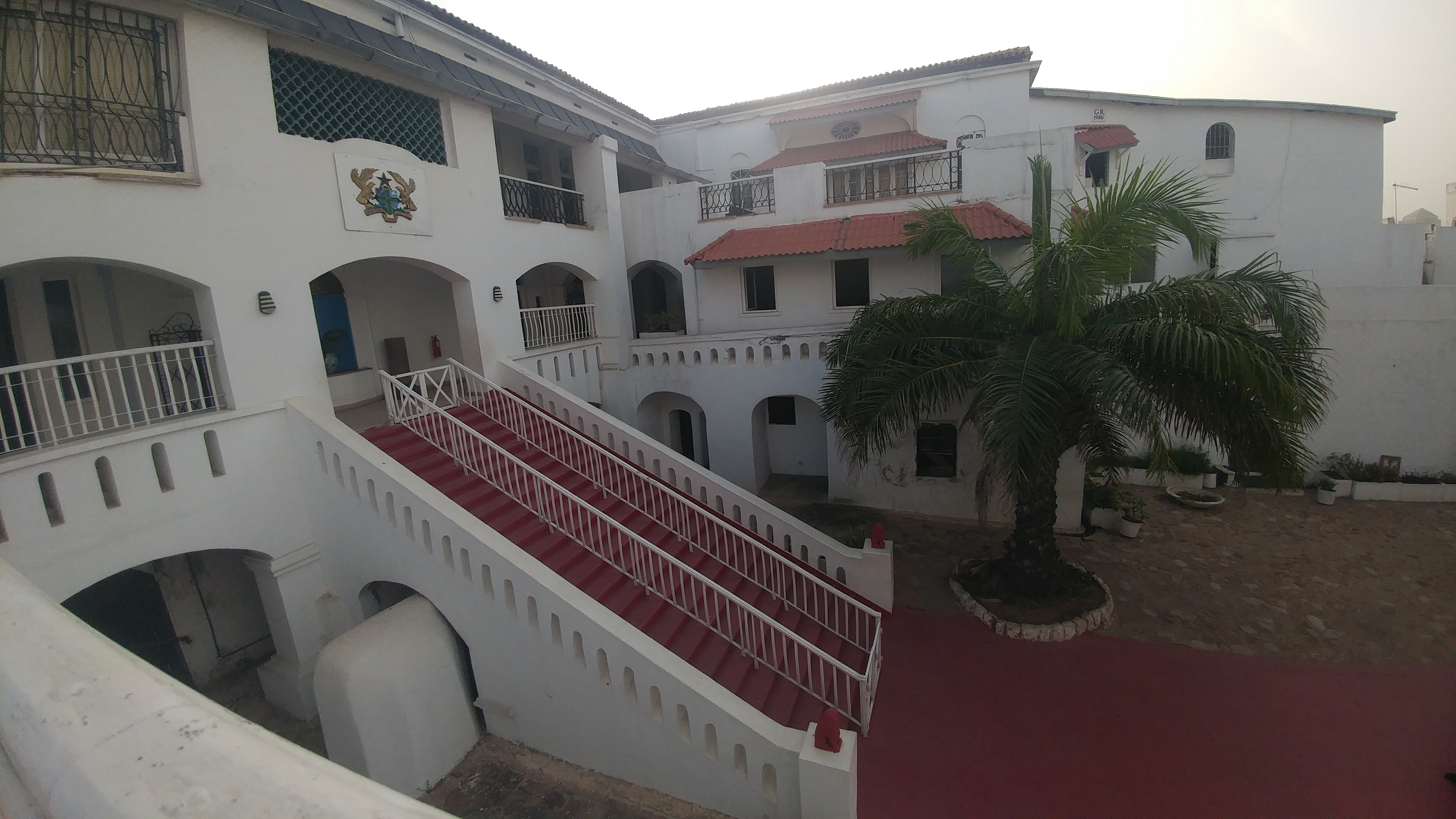
Christianborg Castle, Ghana

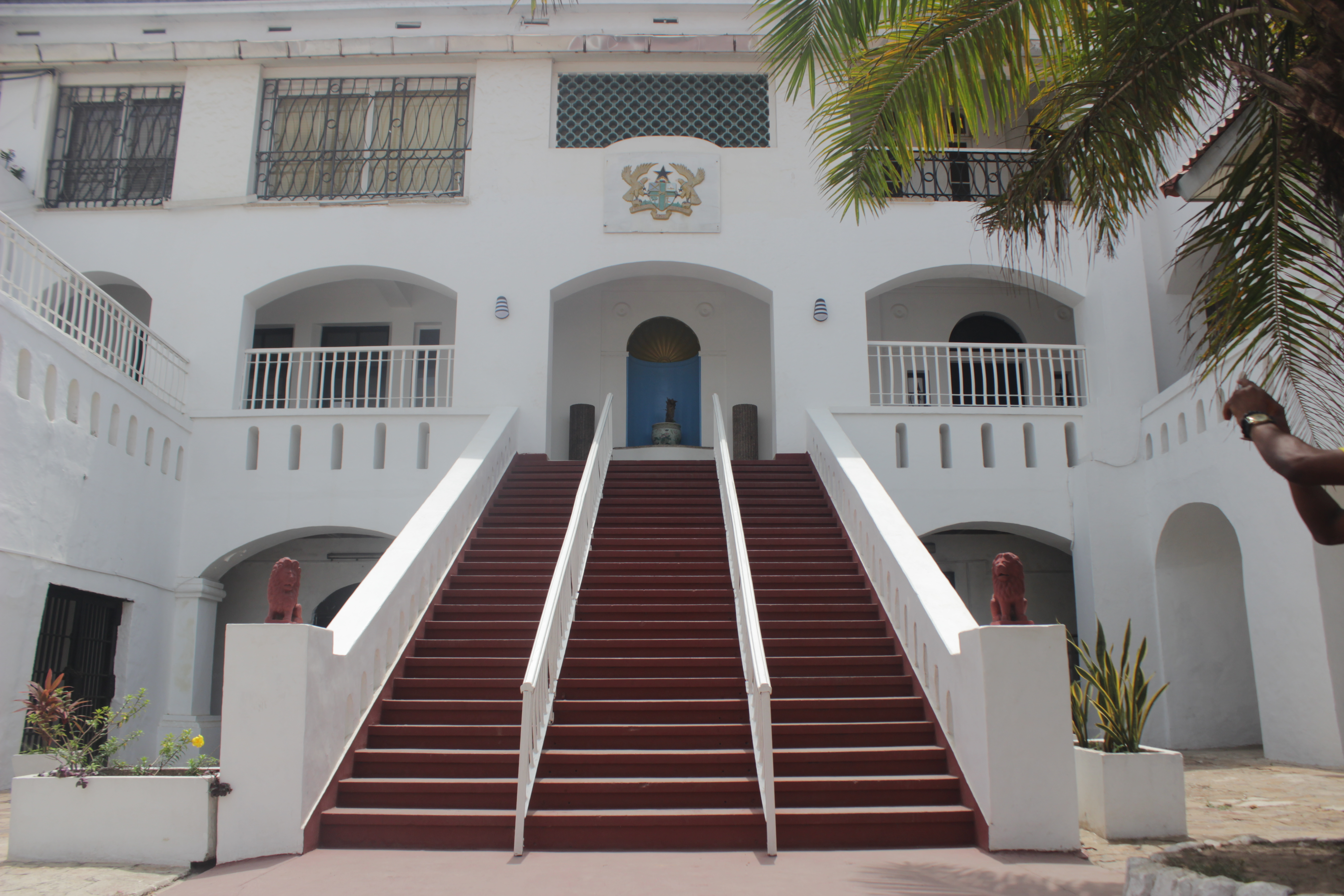
Osu Castle in Ghana

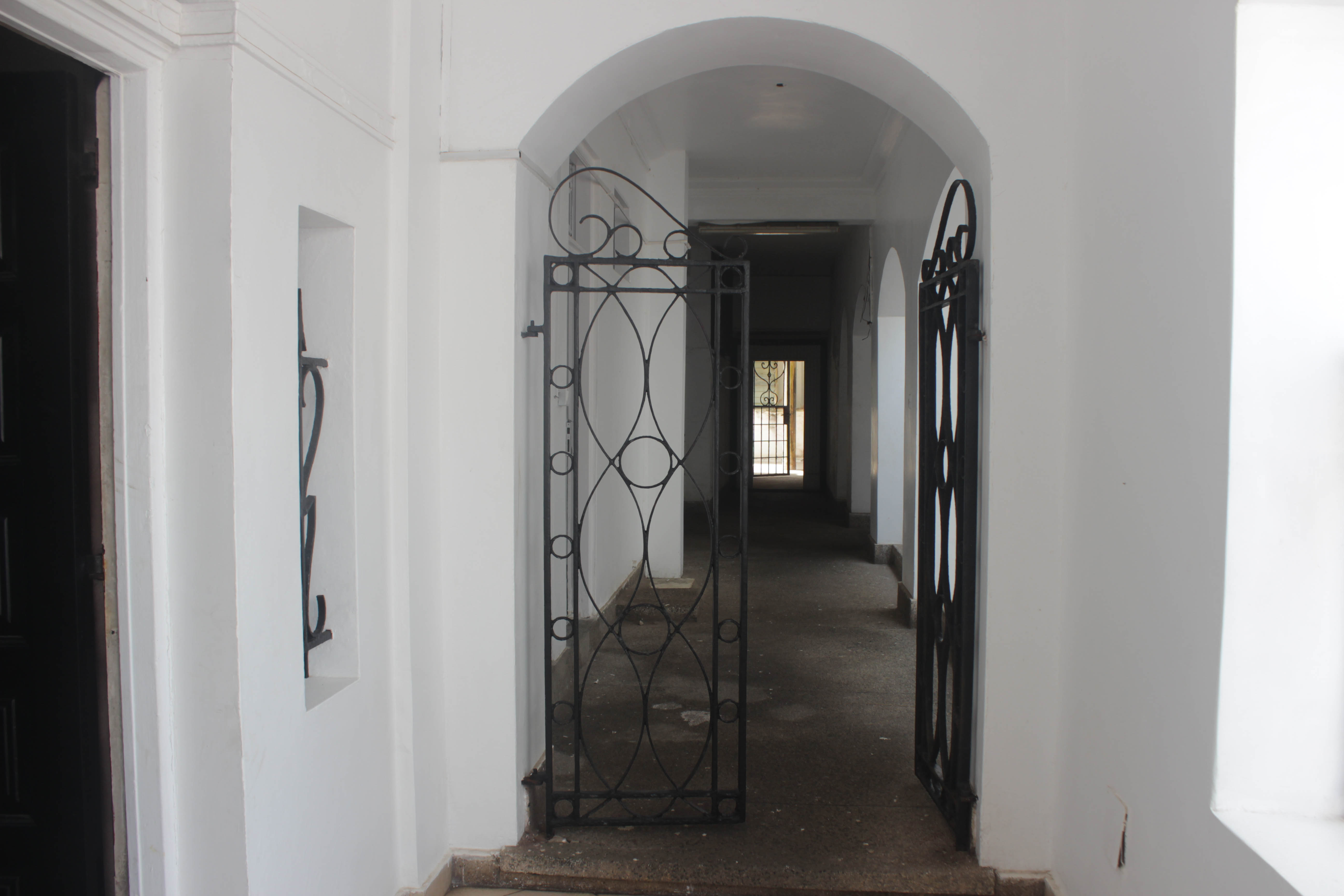

== Sources ==
- Albert van Dantzig; Barbara Priddy, A Short History of the Forts and Castles of Ghana (Accra: Liberty Press, 1971).
