= Capture of Carolusborg (1658) =

Colonial conflict between the Danes and Swedes

Coordinates: 5°06′13″N 1°14′29″W

- Part of Dano-Swedish War (1657–1658)
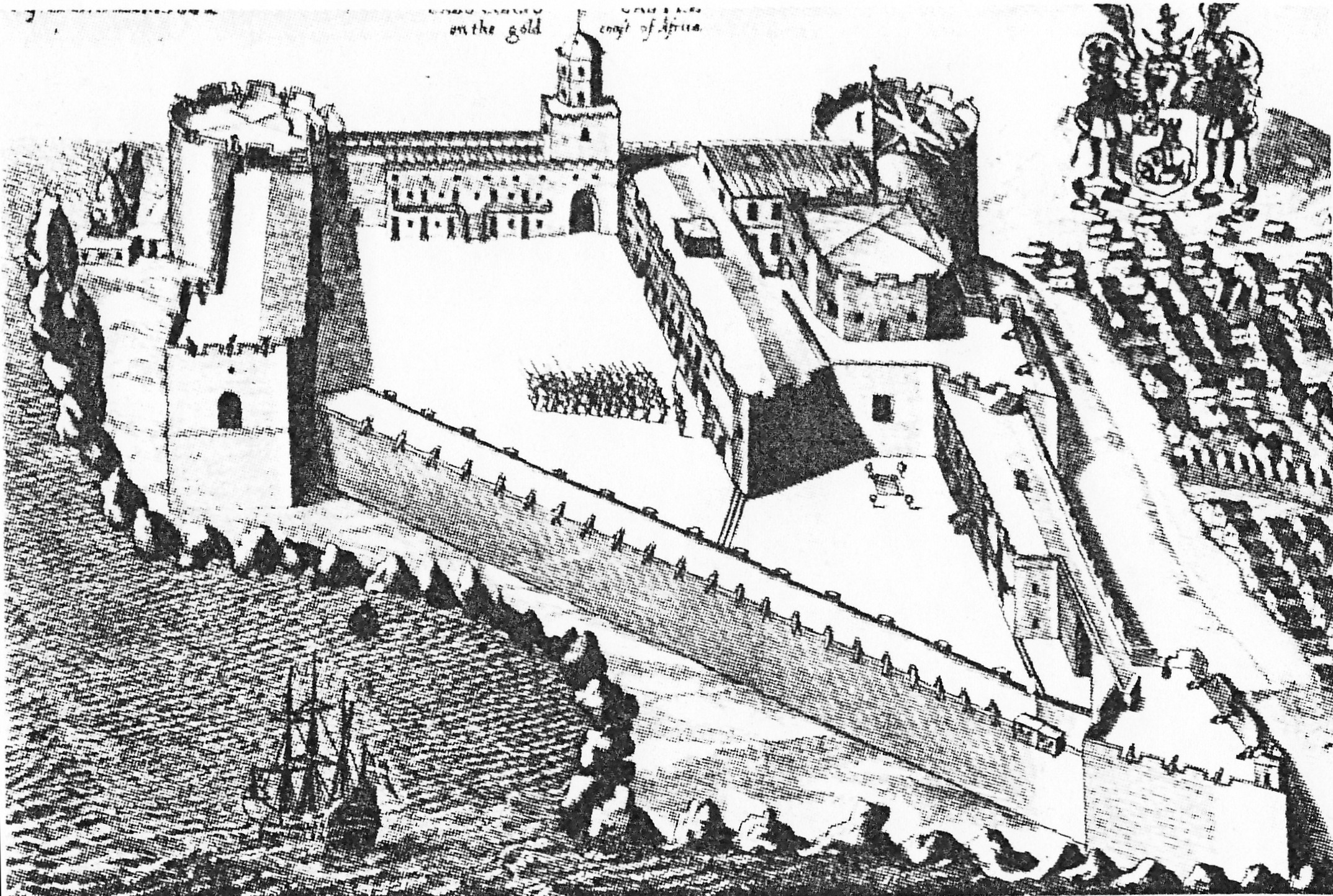
- Fort Carolusborg, built on the initiative of Hendrik Carloff
Date	26 January 1658
Location	Carolusborg, Gold coast
Result	Dano-Norwegian victory
Territorial changes	Carolusborg conquered by Denmark-Norway

Belligerents
Swedish Empire	Denmark-Norway; Glückstad Company; Dutch Gold Coast; Fetu Kingdom; Rebellious slaves

Commanders and leaders
Johann Phillip (POW); Unknown captain (POW)	(Denmark–Norway) Hendrik Carloff Acrosan; Hennique

Units involved
Carolusborg garrison Stockholms Slot	(Denmark–Norway) Glückstadt

Strength
16 men 1 ship	40–50 Dano-Norwegians; 50–60 Dutch remidors 22 Dutch sailors 100 Fetu natives 4 boats Total: 190–210 men

Casualties and losses
Entire garrison surrendered 1 ship captured	Negligible

The capture of Carolusborg (1658) was carried out by the newly recruited Hendrik Carloff who seized the Swedish fort of Carolusborg on the Gold Coast.

== Background ==
Founder

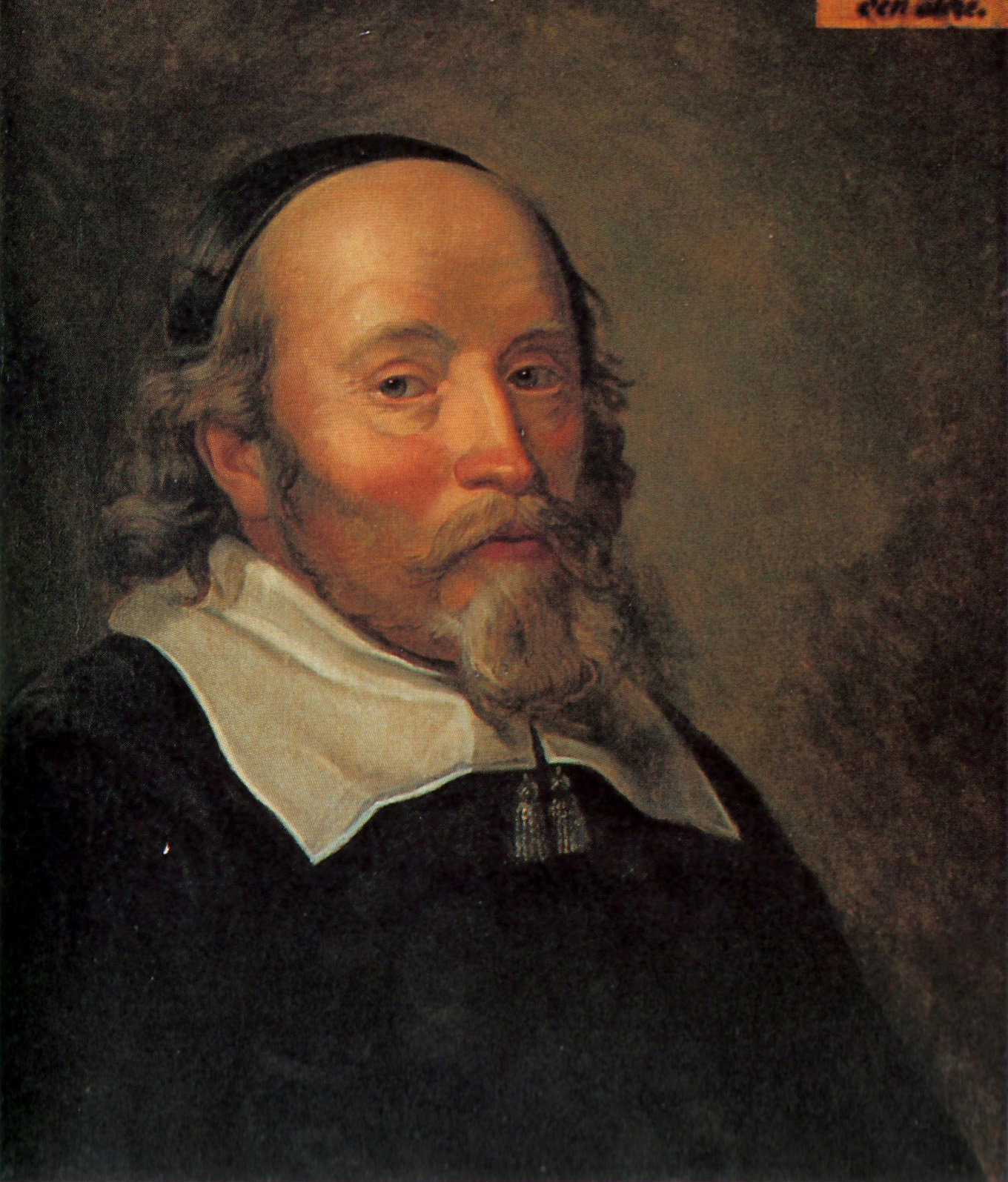
Louis De Geer the Elder. 1587-1657 by David Beck

=== Establishment of the Swedish Africa company ===
In 1649, the Swedish African company would be created by Louis De Geer along with his son Laurens and other nobles with the privilege to trade slaves, gold and ivory with a letter of privilege issued by Queen Christina. De Geer held the majority share in the company, while Gustaf Horn, Johan Adeler Salvius, and Peter Julius Coyet owned smaller stakes.

=== 1650 expedition ===
In 1650, the two ships, Christina and Stockholms Slott were prepared for an expedition into Africa. Queen Christina excitedly attended the preparations. The ships were loaded with fabrics, copper, iron, tin, glass beads, knives, mirrors and brandy in order to conduct trade on the Gold coast. When the ships arrived, the Swedes set up a trading post and returned to Sweden with gold, ivory and sugar.

An aide to De Geer, a man named Hendrik Carloff, was appointed governor of the colony, and quickly began preparations to construct a fortress.

=== Establishment of Carolusborg ===
Map

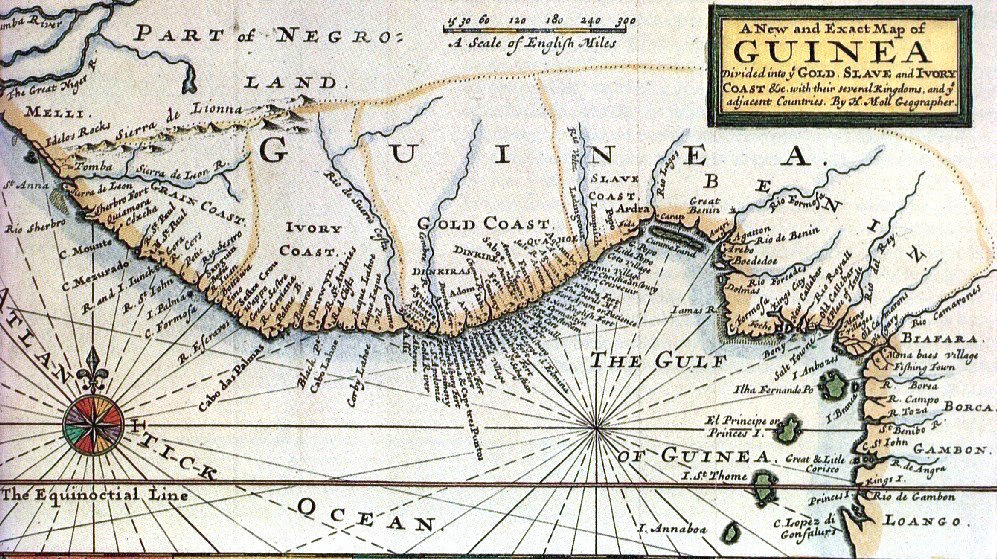
Historic map of the coast of West Africa, then called "Guinea", c. 1725 by Herman Moll

After he had arrived on the Gold coast on 22 April 1650, Carloff quickly began working to renew an agreement that had previously been signed by a certain Gabbesen with King Bredeva of the Fetu. After this, despite protests from other natives he began construction of a fort he named Carolusborg.

=== Hendrik Carloff's defection ===
In 1656, a feud erupted between Hendrik and the Swedish Africa company, leading to his angry resignation. Following the outbreak of the Dano-Swedish War, he offered his services to the Danish king, Frederick III, who assigned him a mission to capture Carolusborg from the Swedes.

== Capture ==
Fetu warriors

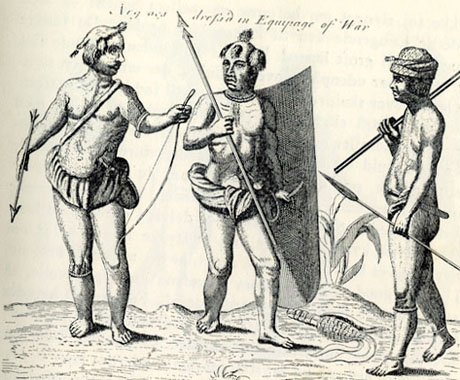
Representations of Fetu Warriors by Edmund Halley

On December 1, after signing an agreement with the Danish king, Carloff began sailing to the Gold coast from Glückstadt harbor. When he arrived at Gemoree on January 25, he showed the Swedish colors which prompted the local Swedish agent to send a man to him. However, Carloff detained the man in order to extract information from him about Carolusborg. From the information he received, he quickly sailed over to the nearby Fort Axim controlled by the Dutch to ask for help in taking the fortress. The Dutch quickly agreed to help Carloff, giving him 4 boats, 50-60 Remidors, and 22 sailors. During a march towards Carolusborg in the night, Carloff sent messages to all neighbouring tribes requesting aid in expelling the Swedes. The most important person he contacted was the brother of the King of the Fetu, Hennique. He was able to persuade the African chief to promise aid to Carloff, and under the cover of night he let Carloff into Ogua where the chief called together the slaves under the Swedish African company and promised them riches if they offered their assistance.

In the next morning, a dense fog covered the surrounding area of Carolusborg, and after the company slaves had picked up their tools and entered the fortress they knocked down a Swedish sentry and announced that those who didn't show resistance would receive their pay as normal. They also opened the gate, allowing the Dutch sailors and approximately 100 natives to enter. Since the Swedish garrison only consisted of 16 men, resistance was all but futile. The Swedish commander and governor, Johann Philipp von Krusenstjerna, was captured along with the captain of the Stockholms slott when Johann was forced to lure him into the fortress. The Dutch support troops were able to persuade the Dutch sailors who made up the majority of the crew on the Stockholms slott to come to them, and since the remaining Swedish crew were not numerous enough to sail away, the Dutch were able to capture it.

== Aftermath ==
The Swedes in the garrison who chose to enter into service under Carloff were permitted to do so, and Carloff gathered them in the hall of the fort and forced them to swear an oath of allegiance to himself and make a written confirmation of it. The Danish flag would eventually be hoisted, and the Danish artillery signal would be fired.
