= Dano-Dutch colonial conflict on the Gold Coast =

War between the Dutch and Danish, 1661–1665

- Part of the prelude to Second Anglo-Dutch War
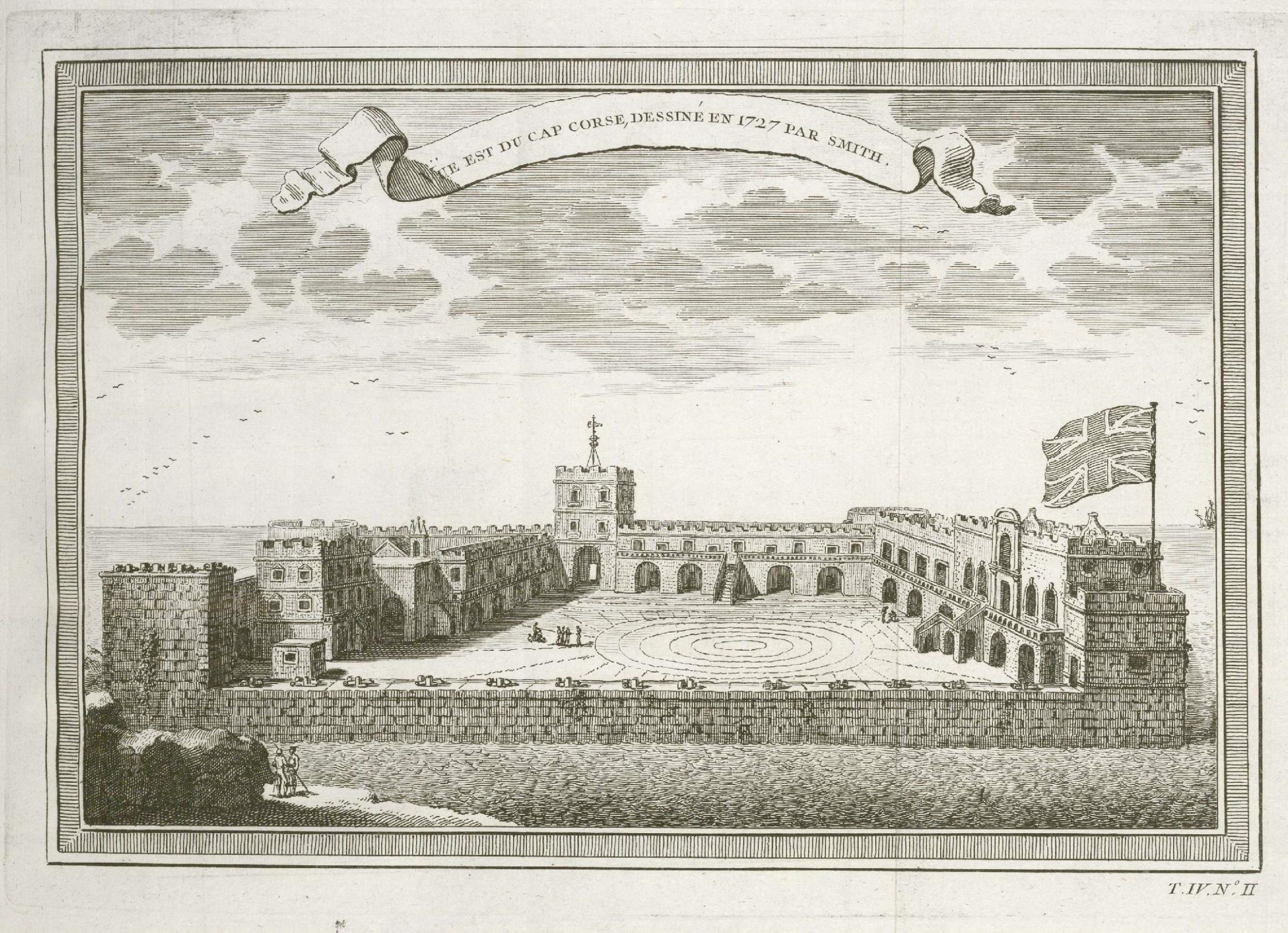
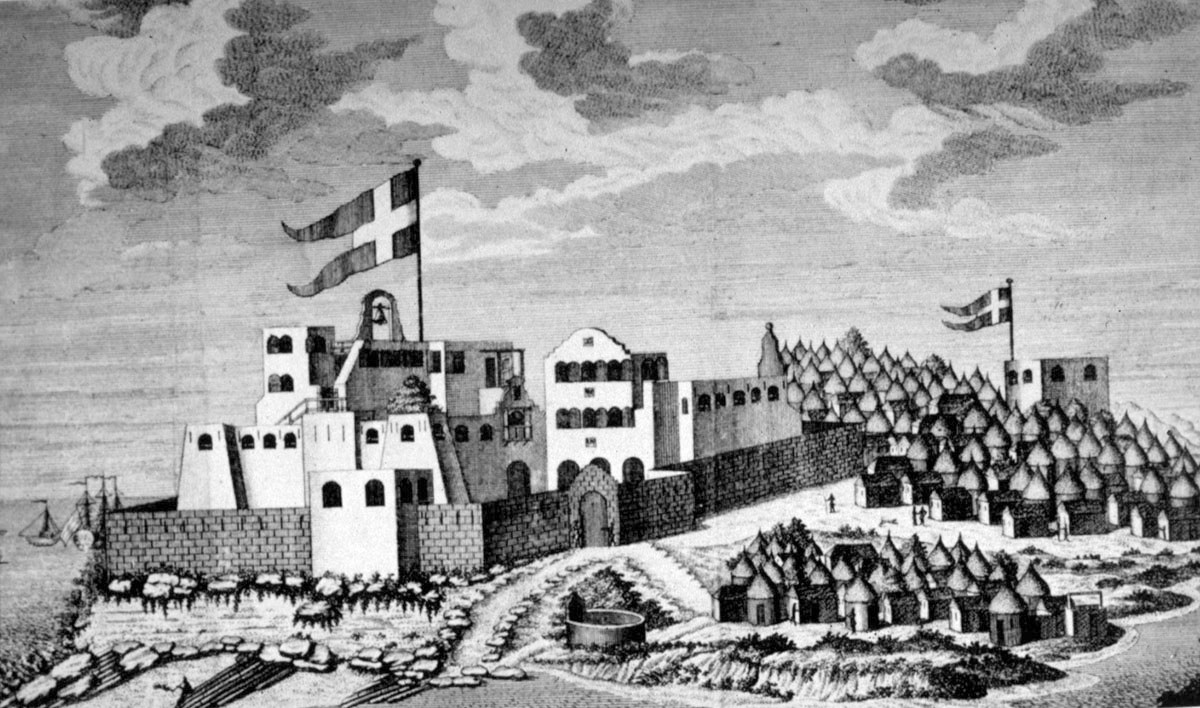
- Top: Cape Coast, c. 1727; Bottom: Christiansborg, c. 1760
Date	1661–1665
Location	Gold Coast; Sierra Leone River
Result	Anglo-Danish victory
Territorial changes	Cape Corso conquered by the English

Belligerents
Denmark-Norway; Glückstad Company; England; Royal African Company	Dutch Republic; Dutch West India Company

Commanders and leaders
(Denmark–Norway) Henning Albrecht; Robert Holmes	Jan Valckenburgh; Michiel de Ruyter; Tobias Pensade

Strength
England: 6-7 ships Denmark-Norway: Unknown	13 warships

Casualties and losses
Denmark-Norway: 2 ships	Unknown

The Dano-Dutch colonial conflict on the Gold Coast (Danish: Dansk-Hollandske kolonikonflikt på Guldkysten, Dutch: Deens-Nederlands koloniaal conflict aan de Goudkust) was a colonial conflict between the Danes and Dutch over the control of European fortifications on the Gold Coast. Denmark-Norway, assisted by England, defeated the Dutch in various places, although Michiel de Ruyter retaliated against the English by recapturing all forts but Cape Coast. (Note: Alternative names include Carolusborg (Swedish), Carlsborg (Danish), Cape Corso (Portuguese)) This forced the Royal African Company into bankruptcy, an event which started the Second Anglo-Dutch War.

== Background and prelude ==
Kings of Scandinavia (1658)
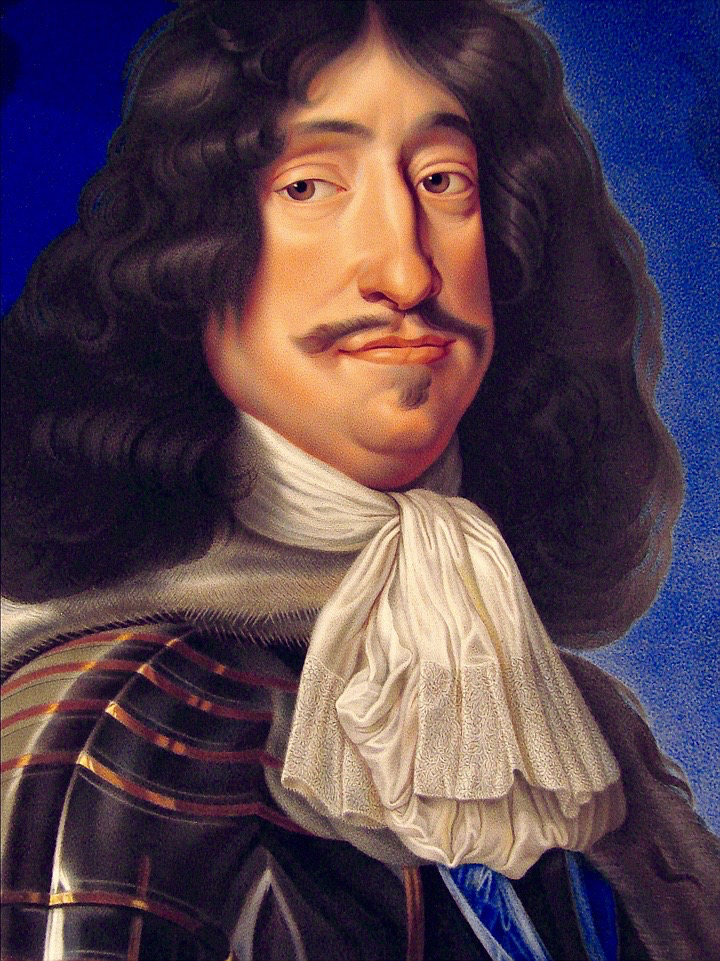
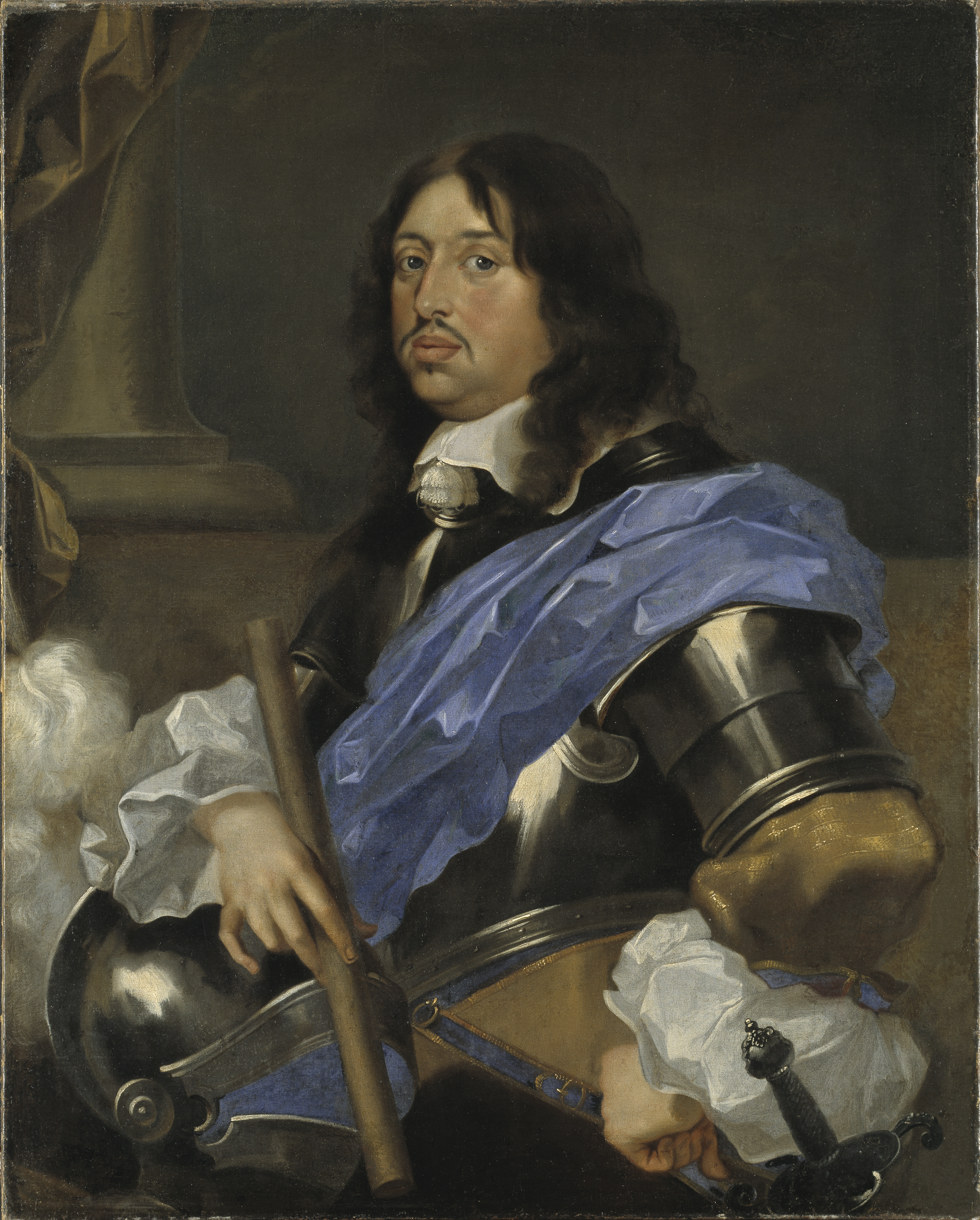
Frederick III (left) and Charles X Gustav (right)

Since 1655, the Swedish Empire had waged war against the Polish-Lithuanian Commonwealth. Eager to regain Denmark's lost territories in 1648, Frederick III declared war on Sweden. In response Charles X Gustav surprisingly turned his army towards Jutland. The Harsh winter of 1657/1658 led to the freezing of the Danish Straits, and the Swedish army exploited this by marching across them. Completely unexpected for Frederick, he was compelled to sign the Treaty of Roskilde.

The Danes stalled and prolonged the fulfillment of some of the provisions of the Treaty signed at Roskilde, and Charles could thus use this as an excuse for planning to vanquish Denmark-Norway as a sovereign state. Charles declared war on Denmark-Norway

=== Dano-Dutch alliance ===
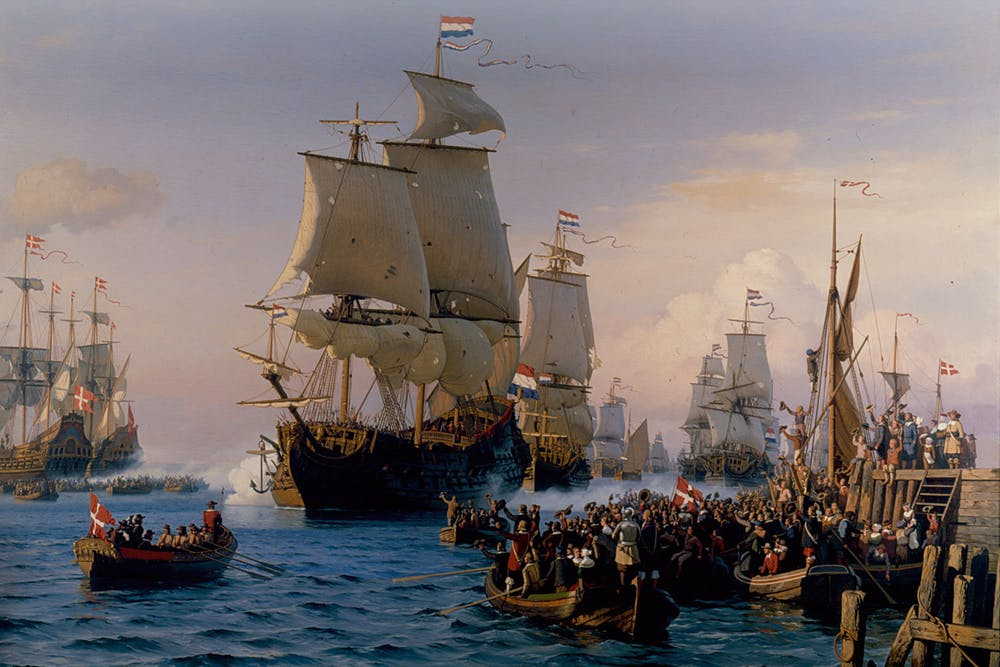
The Dutch fleet relieves Copenhagen (1658)

Denmark-Norway and the Dutch Republic had previously signed a defensive alliance, and the Dutch Republic was hesitant to establish peace in the Baltic Sea. The warfare quickly spread to the European colonies. The Danes had two years earlier in 1658, conquered the newly established Swedish fort of Carolusborg and now both the Dutch and the local tribes were also interested in Carolusborg.

In the following years, the castle switched hands multiple times. In 1659 the Danes under Immanuel Schmid, gave the Castle of Cape Corso, as well as the castles in Anamabo and Osu to the Dutch. After this, the natives of Fetu (also known as Afutu) besieged Cape Corso and successfully took it in 1660. However, the Swedes were able to regain control and held the castle from 1660 to 1663. In a surprising turn of events, the Fetus retook the castle from the Swedes in 1663, through treachery. However the Fetus handed over the fort to the Dutch the same year.

=== Tensions on the Gold Coast ===
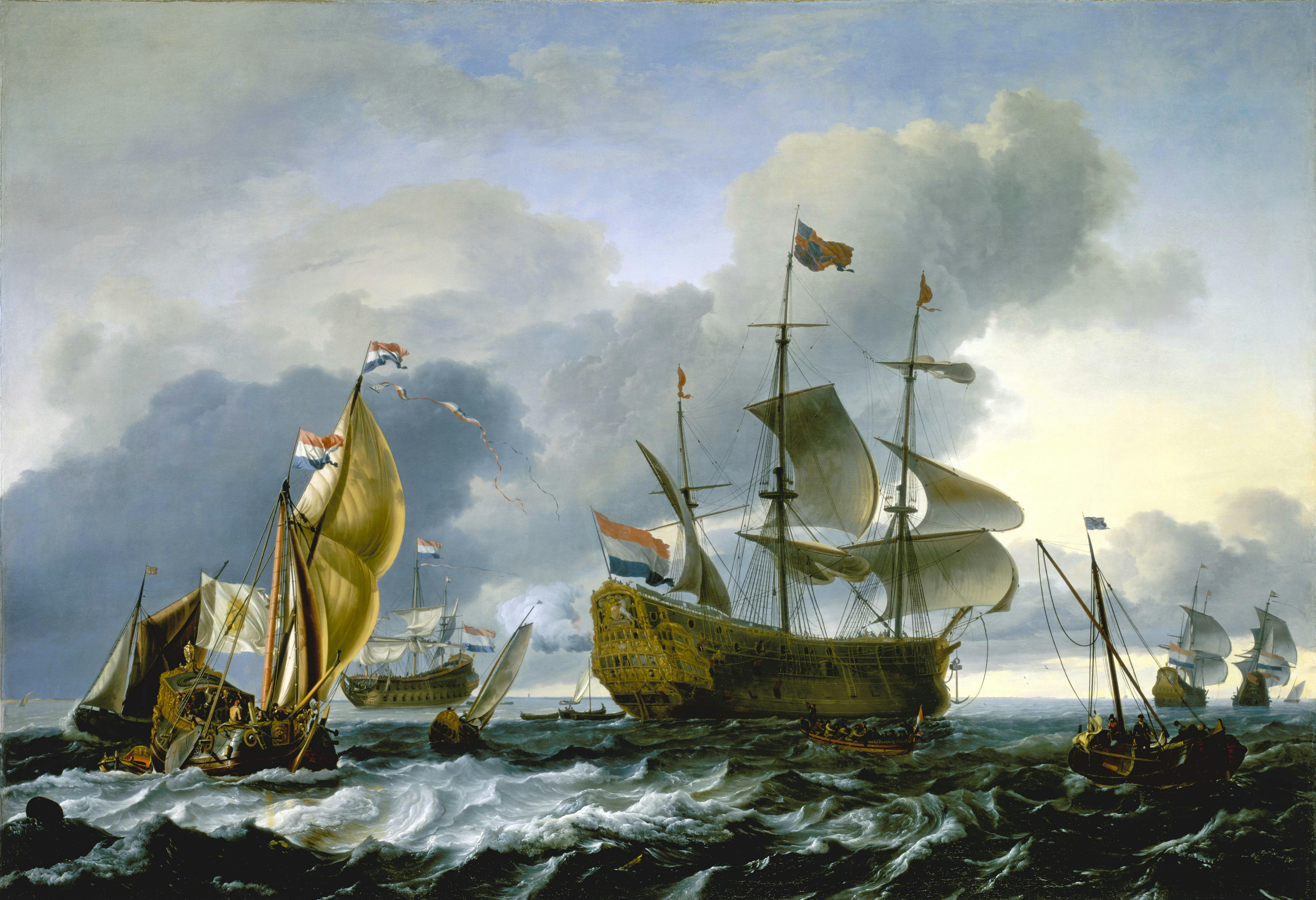
The Dutch navy in action (1667)

When two Danish vessels in late 1659 showed up off the coast of Ghana, they were received with the news that the Danes no longer controlled Cape Corso. The crew negotiated with the local fetus for other possible forts. They came to the conclusion that for c. 1500 Danish rigsdaler, they were ceded the previous Prussian fort of Friedrichsburg (Danish: Frederiksborg) and a small trade outpost between Frederiksborg and Cape Corso. In the same year they also were given a small Dutch trading post near Cong. As a result, Denmark had three strongholds in Ghana. The following year, 1660, the English established the Royal African Company with the goal of competing against the Dutch control of the Atlantic slave trade. The Dutch feared that the English might cease control of the weaker Danish outposts and thereby participate in the lucrative slave trade. They therefore launched small scale raids on Danish bases and ships in Africa. The Dutch claimed that the Danes had forcefully driven them away from their lodge at Cong and on April 24, 1661, they attacked the Danish lodge at Cong and burned it down. The personnel present were taken to the Dutch Fort Nassau located further east in Sabu.

The Dutch raids against Danish vessels in the area continued and in 1662, two Danish ships were attacked and captured. Several other ships were also targeted, but in many instances, the Danes managed to repel the Dutch attacks.

In December 1662, a Dutch force led by Commander Valkenburgh attacked a new Danish lodge at Bagos, near the Sierra Leone River. Two ships bombarded the Danish lodge, and later the crew went ashore and captured the lodge and valuable goods. More significant attacks to the Danish forts came in 1664, in response to the recent confrontation with England.

== War ==
=== Frederiksborg ===
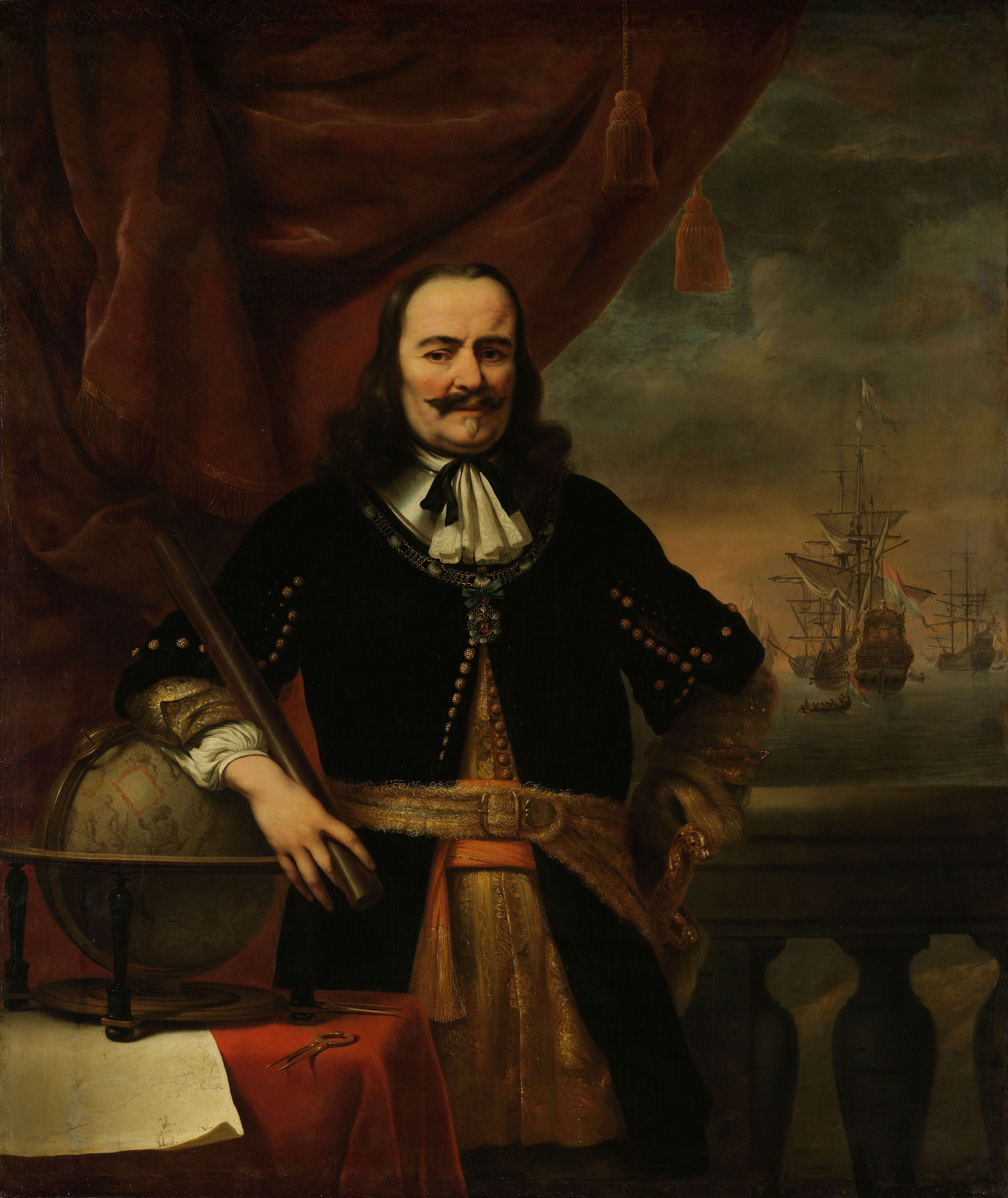
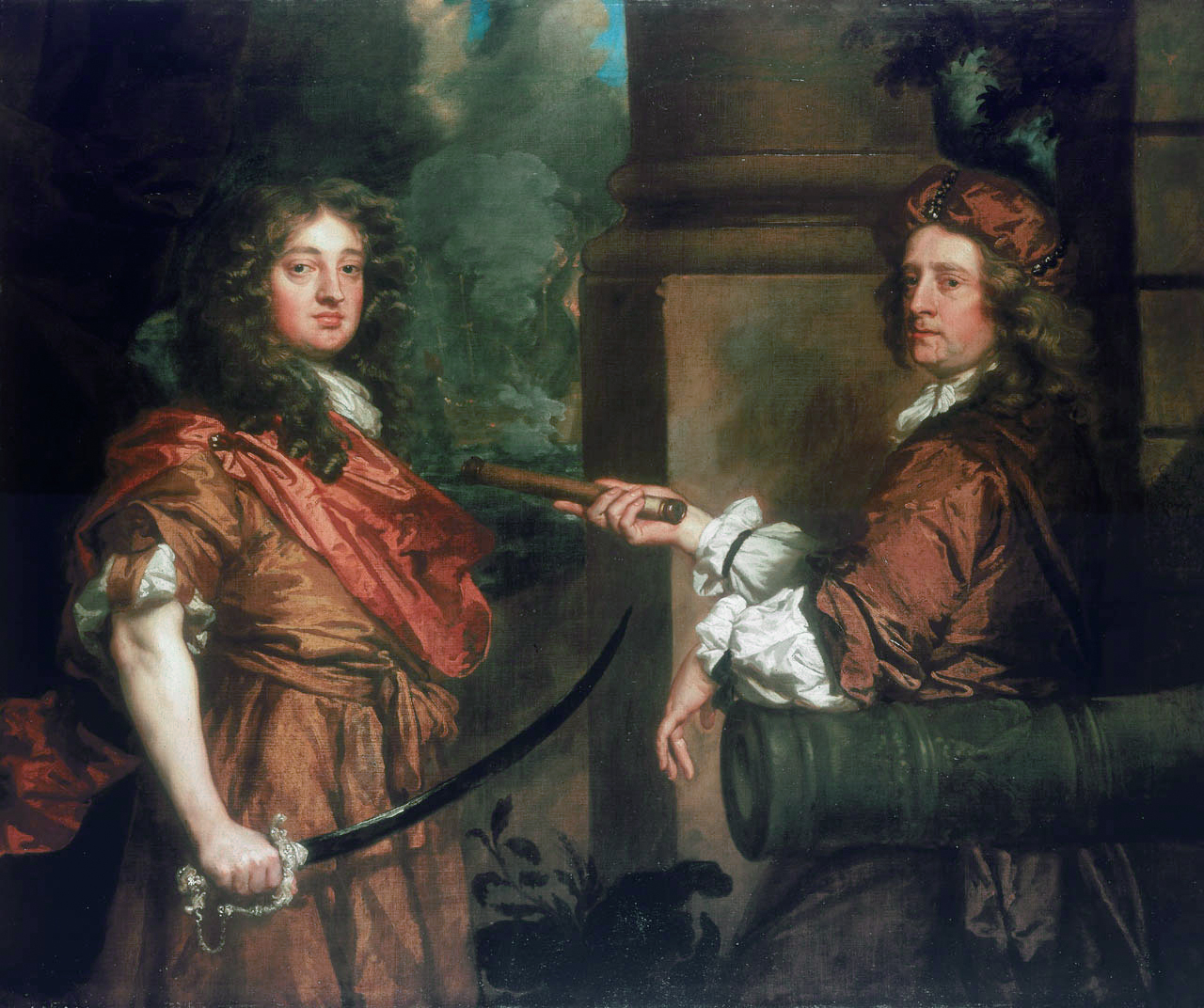
Michiel de Ruyter (left) and Frescheville Holles and Robert Holmes (Right)

On March 23, 1664, the Dutch launched an attack on the small trading post located between Capo Corso and Fredriksberg. Additionally, they bombarded Fredriksberg (which only lay a cannon shot away from Cape Corso) by the sea for several days and initiated a siege of the fort. The fort's garrison defended themselves with the assistance of local Fetu warriors who were affiliated with the fort. The English who were recently at constant competition with the Dutch, were quick to help. On 14 April, the English admiral, Robert Holmes was sent with 6-7 vessels to assist the besieged Danes. At the arrival of the English on the coast of Frederiksborg, the Danes now faced the cannons towards Cape Corso and with English help bombarded the fortress.

=== Cape Corso ===
8 days in a row, Cape Corso was bombarded by the sea side and from Frederiksborg. A combined Anglo-Danish army had landed nearby Cape Corso and had too, started bombarding the castle. The bombardments were to weaken the garrison at the castle, for the troops to eventually launch an assault on the fort. This was not needed though, and the Dutch capitulated the fort to the English, who named it Cape Coast Castle.

== Aftermath ==
The Danish-Norwegian presence at the Gold Coast was saved by the English and would go on until 1850. In retaliation for the bombardment of Cape Corso, the Dutch admiral, Michiel de Ruyter tried to recapture the lost possessions by 13 men-of-war. This confrontation escalated to the Second Anglo-Dutch War and as a result of a delay in receiving orders, the Norwegian commanders sided with the Dutch at Vågen, despite a secret agreement by Frederick III and Charles II. Denmark was thus forced to join the Netherlands and peace was concluded in 1667 at Breda.

== See also ==
- Swedish Gold Coast – Swedish colony in present-day Ghana
- Commonwealth of England – Period of republican government, 1649–1660
- Dano-Swedish War (1658–1660) – War between Denmark–Norway and Sweden that took place between 1658-60
- Dutch East India Company – 1602–1799 Dutch trading company
- Sagbadre War – 1784 Danish punitive expedition in Gold Coast
