= Danish Gold Coast =

Danish colony in Africa from 1658 to 1850

Danish Gold Coast Settlements Danske Guldkyst
- 1658–1850
- Flag of Denmark Coat of arms of Denmark

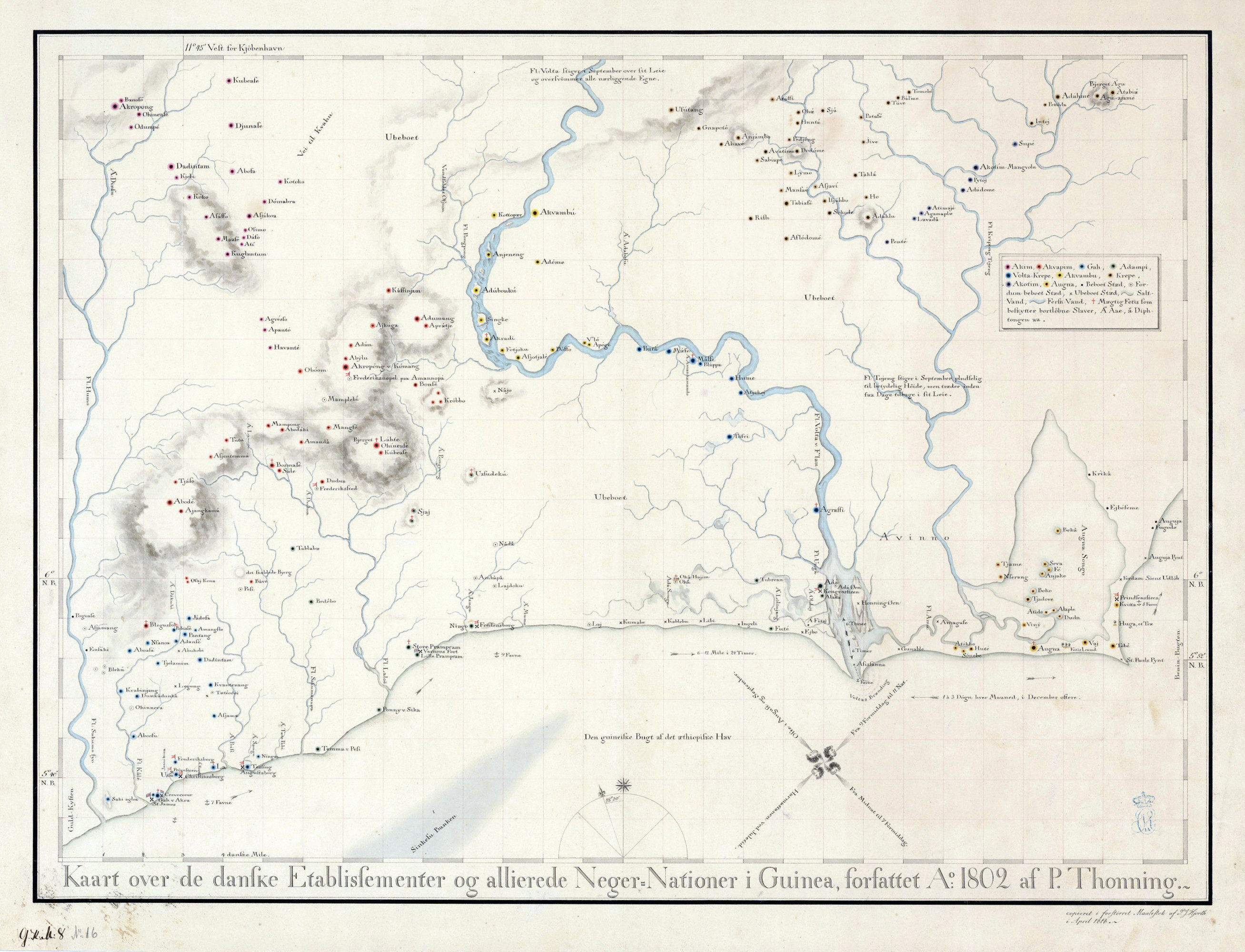
- Map of the Danish settlements on the Gold Coast based on a survey conducted by Peter Thonning in 1802

- Danish Gold Coast (Ghana) Map of the Danish Gold Coast
- Status: Dano-Norwegian colony (1658–1814); Danish colony (1814–1850)
- Capital: Fort Christiansborg (1658-1850)
- Common languages: Danish, German (official); Ga, Dangme, Ewe, Akan
- King of Denmark
  - 1658–1670: Frederick III of Denmark-Norway (first)
  - 1848–1850: Frederick VII of Denmark (last)
- Governor
  - 1658-1659: Hendrik Carloff
  - 1844-1850: Edvard James Arnold Carstensen
- History
  - Denmark-Norway annexation from Sweden: 1658
  - Treaty of Copenhagen: 1660
  - Disestablished: March 30 1850
- Currency: Danish rigsdaler
Preceded by	Succeeded by
Swedish Gold Coast	British Gold Coast
- Today part of: Ghana

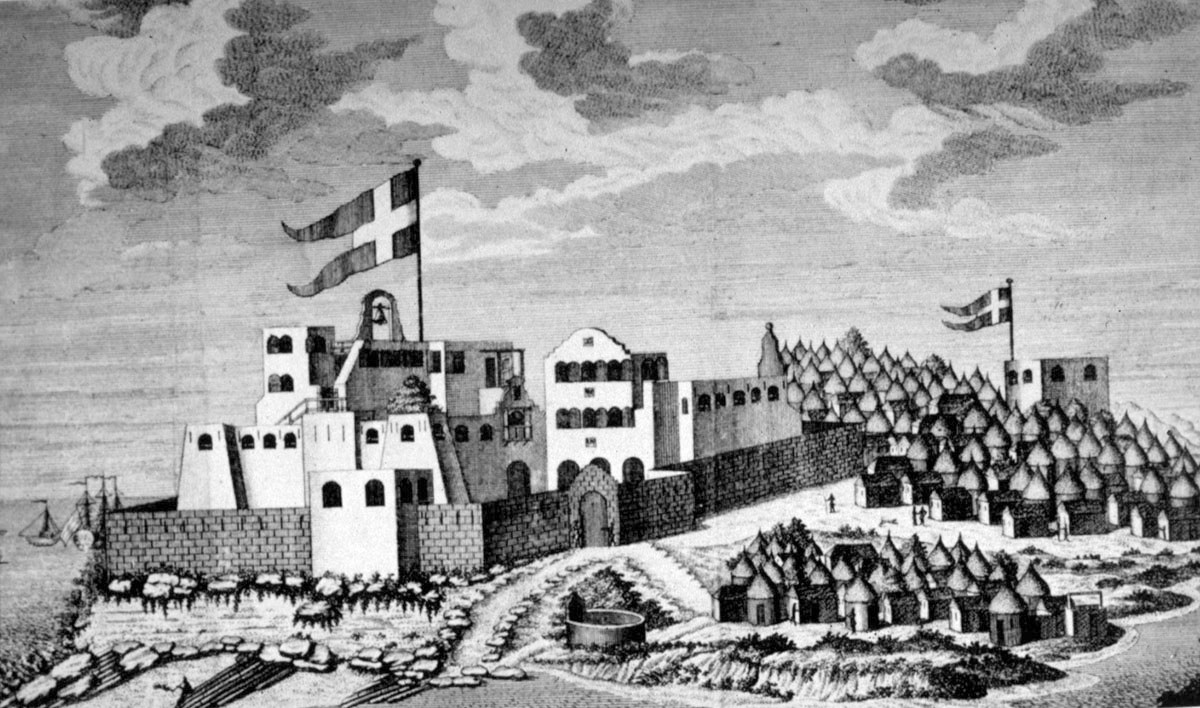
A contemporary drawing of Fort Christiansborg, now Osu Castle. The outpost to the right is Fort Prøvestenen.

The Danish Gold Coast (Danish: Danske Guldkyst or Dansk Guinea) comprised the colonies that Denmark–Norway controlled in Africa as a part of the Gold Coast (roughly present-day southeast Ghana), which is on the Gulf of Guinea. It was colonized by the Dano-Norwegian fleet, first under indirect rule by the Danish West India Company (a chartered company), later as a crown colony of the kingdom of Denmark-Norway. The area under Danish influence was over 10,000 square kilometres, with an estimated population of approximately 40,000 in 1837.

The five Danish forts were sold to the United Kingdom in 1850. Denmark had wanted to sell these colonies for some time as the expenses required to run the colonies had increased following the abolition of slavery. Although Britain was also struggling with rising costs, it sought to purchase them to reduce French and Belgian influence in the region, as well as to further curtail the slave trade that still operated there. The purchased settlements and forts were later incorporated into the British Gold Coast.

== History ==
=== Early Danish efforts on the Gold Coast ===
Scandinavian participation in trade and settlement along the Gold Coast began relatively late compared to other Western European powers. Denmark–Norway and Sweden were geographically distant from West Africa and only entered the region after Portuguese, Dutch, and English interests were already established. Once they did, their presence contributed to growing rivalry between the two Scandinavian kingdoms.

It is likely that individual Scandinavian sailors had taken part in earlier Portuguese or Dutch expeditions along the West African coast, and some may even have engaged in piracy or private trading. However, such activities were typically undocumented, particularly when secrecy was required to avoid detection by rival European powers.

The first attempt to organize a state-backed Scandinavian trading enterprise was strongly influenced by Dutch commercial ideas. A central figure was the Dutch merchant Willem Usselinx, who had played a key role in founding the Dutch West India Company in 1621. After losing influence within that company, Usselinx sought support elsewhere. He initially approached King Christian IV of Denmark without success, then turned to King Gustavus Adolphus of Sweden, who responded more favorably, by authorizing him to found a chartered company for Swedish trade with Africa and the Americas.

Consequently, a separate initiative was undertaken by a merchant syndicate led by Johan de Willum, which sought royal authorization to exclusively engage in trade with the West Indies, Brazil, Virginia, and the Guinea coast—regions already exploited by merchants from other European states. However this failed. A renewed Danish effort followed in 1636, when Christian IV authorized the brothers Johan and Gédért Braem and their associates to create a Guinea and Africa Company. Compared to earlier ventures, this company enjoyed more favorable terms, including a twelve-year exemption from customs duties and the right to admit foreign investors, along with assurances of further advantages if the enterprise proved viable. Even so, the economic strain affecting Denmark in the final years of Christian IV’s reign prevented the company from succeeding. This is contrasted with the success of the Swedes, which saw the establishment of the Swedish Gold Coast in 1650.

=== Early years (1658-1665) ===
An opportunity to for the Danes to establish themselves on the Gold Coast and eject the Swedes appeared in the person of Hendrik Carloff, a former employee of the Swedish Africa Company. After being accused by the Swedes of conducting unauthorized private commerce and weakened by the death of his patron Louis de Geer resigned from Swedish service in 1656 and left the country. When hostilities erupted between Denmark and Sweden, he turned to the Danish crown and, in August 1657, obtained a letter of marque empowering him to capture Fort Carlsborg and attack Swedish interests in Guinea at his own cost.

Under this agreement, Carloff was granted broad autonomy: he could capture Swedish ships, keep most of the proceeds, and dispose of former Swedish forts himself the Danish King wished not to keep them. He sailed from Glückstadt in December 1657 and reached the Gold Coast in January 1658. Lacking sufficient forces, he secured assistance from the Dutch at Axim and sought support from local African leaders, particularly Acrosan (Johan Classen), a senior official of the Fetu kingdom. By invoking prior promises to transfer the fort to him, promising debt relief, and offering rewards, Carloff won over the native Africans. With this support he managed to capture all Swedish forts by February 1658. After raising the Danish flag and leaving a Dutchman called Samuel Schmidt in command of Fort Carlsborg, alongside 40 men, Carloff returned to Denmark. This however caused immediate controversy, as the Swedes demanded that Carloff be arrested and the Gold Coast be handed back to them in accordance with the Treaty of Roskilde. Carloff fled and the Danes refused to hand over the forts, causing a resumption in hostilities between Denmark and Sweden. This issue would not be solved until the treaty of Copenhagen in 1660, where Sweden got 400,000 rixdollars as compensation for their losses.

However on the Gold Coast the situation was different. After repelling a Swedish attempt to retake the Fort Carlsborg the commander Schmidt abandoned it, selling it and all Danish stations to the Dutch in 1659. This angered the King of Fetu, who ordered Johan Classen to retake the fort, which he did after a six week siege in 1660. He then handed it back on December 10, 1660 to the Swedish Africa Company. The fort was retaken by the Dutch in 1663 after the natives stopped supporting the Swedes and finally taken by the English in 1664, who made it the capital of their forts on the Gold Coast. Also during this period a Danish expedition sent by the newly established Danish West India Company managed to acquire Fort Fredriksborg from the King of Fetu in December 1659. They also acquired Cong Heights from the King of Sabu. However the Heights were conquered by the Dutch in 1661, who continued to harass Danish interests in the region. These actions were protested by the Danes in both England and France. This led to the dispatch of an English fleet led by Admiral Robert Holmes to conquer Dutch possessions on the Gold Coast, conquering Fort Carlsborg with the assistance of the Danes on May 1664. After this conquest they renamed the fort Cape Coast Castle and maintained good relations with the Danes of Fort Fredriksborg.

=== Post Abolition of slavery ===
Following the 1792 decree abolishing Denmark's participation in the Atlantic slave trade (implemented in 1803), the purpose of their forts on the Guinea coast became uncertain. Previously, these outposts had served solely for the slave trade, with no real impact beyond isolated trading activities. Colonial planners, recognising their limited knowledge of the surrounding territories (as evidenced by requests for detailed information), sought for other options. This shift coincided with growing abolitionist sentiment and the desire to establish plantation colonies in Africa to produce tropical commodities such as sugar and coffee.

Debate arose over the most suitable locations for these new agricultural endeavours. The fertile Volta River region and the Akuapem Hills emerged as frontrunners, with the Council on the Guinea Coast even resisting orders to close outlying forts, fearing negative consequences for trade and security. The Slave Trade Commission ultimately favoured the Volta region for plantations, while rescinding the closure order in 1799. This back-and-forth illustrates the continuing uncertainty surrounding the future of the forts and the challenges Denmark faced in adapting its colonial strategy in the wake of the abolition of the slave trade.

Internal disagreements within the Danish administration further complicated the future of the forts. Evaluations by Peter Thonning and Governor Wrisberg revealed opposing views on inland and coastal plantation projects. The Coastal Council even suggested a temporary continuation of the slave trade to facilitate the establishment of these ventures. This reflects the challenges Denmark faced - limited geographical knowledge, internal disagreements over strategy and the impact of the Napoleonic Wars, which further hampered colonial efforts.

In the post-Napolenic-war period, Peter Thonning, now focused on cost reduction, proposed new inland fortifications. This shift reflects Denmark's continuing difficulties in adapting its colonial strategy without the slave trade. Figures such as Thonning envisioned inland plantation ventures that required good relations with powerful African states such as Asante. Others, however, advocated a more limited role for the forts, focusing on trade and defence. The Guinea Commission, led by Thonning, explored inland colonies, but ultimately failed to convince a cost-conscious Danish government. King Christian VIII even sought to sell the forts altogether [66]. The arrival of Governor Carstensen in 1842 briefly revived interest in a more active colonial approach, with plantations at Akuapem and annual visits by warships to project power.

However, Denmark's waning enthusiasm for colonialism and financial constraints ultimately led to the sale of the forts to Great Britain in 1850, marking the end of its colonial ambitions in Africa. On 30 March 1850 all of Denmark's Danish Gold Coast Territorial Settlements and forts of the Kingdom of Denmark were sold to Britain and incorporated into the British Gold Coast.

This period reveals the internal struggles within the Danish administration and the unfulfilled ambitions that marked Denmark's brief venture into African colonialism.

The title of its chief colonial administrator was opperhoved (singular; sometimes rendered in English as station chief) since 1658, only in 1766 upgraded to Governor.

=== Danish slave trade ===
The Danes were involved in the slave trade from the mid-17th century until the early 19th century. The Royal Danish Navy and its mercantile marine were recorded as the fourth largest in Europe in this period. With the establishment of the Gold Coast colony in the 1660s, commodities such as gold and ivory dominated at first, but by the turn of the 18th century, slaves were the most important commodity in the Danish trade. Those who commanded the large slave ships were often instructed to convert their cabin into a kind of moveable showroom upon arrival on the African coast. While throughout the 18th century, Danish exports of enslaved Africans accounted for about 5 percent of the total exports from the Gold Coast, by the 1780s, this was up to 10 percent.

In 1672, the Danish West India and Guinea Company also began establishing colonies in the Caribbean at Saint Thomas, Saint John in 1718, and Saint Croix in 1733. While these possessions were rather small, at only 350 square kilometers collectively, they became of utmost importance in the transatlantic slave trade under the Danish flag because of their intensive and highly profitable sugar production which depended on slave labor. As a result, and because mortality rates were higher than fertility rates among slaves in the Danish West Indies, it became necessary to import slaves every year. Most of these enslaved human beings came directly from Africa while others came from foreign Caribbean islands.

After the slave trade was abolished in 1803, Danish colonizers attempted to establish cotton, coffee, and sugar plantations on the Gold Coast; however, these were largely unsuccessful. By 1817, almost all of the Danish posts on the Coast were abandoned, with the exception of Fort Christiansborg, which was, along with the other posts, sold to the British in 1850. Throughout the transatlantic slave trade, it is estimated that about 12.5 million Africans were taken captive and 10.7 million of them were transported to the Americas. The Danish slave trade constituted about 1 percent of this trade, with about 100,000 Africans embarked. Denmark was reportedly the first European colonial empire to ban its slave trade in 1792, although this law did not come into effect until 1803, and illegal trading continued into the nineteenth century.

== Forts and settlements ==
=== Main forts ===
The following forts were in the possession of Denmark until all forts were sold to the United Kingdom in 1850.

Place in Ghana	Fort name	Founded/ Occupied	Ceded	Comments
Accra	Fort Christiansborg	1658	1850	First captured from the Swedes in 1658. Occupied between 1680 and 1682 by the Portuguese. Sold to the United Kingdom in 1850.
Old Ningo	Fort Fredensborg	1734	1850	Sold to the United Kingdom in 1850.
Keta	Fort Prinsensten	1784	1850	Sold to the United Kingdom in 1850.
Ada	Fort Kongensten	1784	1850	Sold to the United Kingdom in 1850.
Teshie	Fort Augustaborg	1787	1850	Sold to the United Kingdom in 1850.

=== Temporarily held forts and trading posts ===
Apart from these main forts, several forts and trading posts were temporarily held by the Danes.

Place in Ghana	Fort name	Founded/ Occupied	Ceded	Comments
Cape Coast	Fort Carlsborg	1658	1664	Captured from the Swedes in 1658. Captured by the British in 1664.
Amanful	Fort Frederiksborg	1659	1685	
Cong	Cong Heights	1659	1661	

== See also ==
- Colonial Heads of Danish Gold Coast the office-holders of the Danish Gold Coast
- Dane gun
- Danish Africa Company
- Dano-Dutch War
