= Johann Philipp von Krusenstjerna =

German soldier of Swedish Africa Company (1624–1659)

Governor of Swedish Gold Coast
- In office February 1656 – 27 January 1658
- Appointed by: Christina, Queen of Sweden
- Preceded by: Hendrik Carloff
- Succeeded by: Anton (Tönnies) Voss

Personal details
- Born: 1626 Probably Gottorf, Duchy of Holstein-Gottorp
- Died: 1659 (aged 32–33) Kronborg, Denmark
- Resting place: St. Mary's Church, Helsingør, Denmark
- Parent(s): Philipp Crusius; Barbara Voigt
- Noble Family: Von Krusenstierna
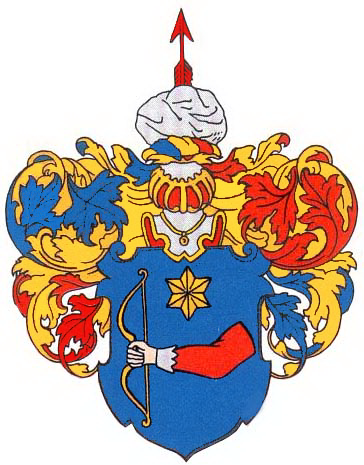
- Coat of Arms

Military service
- Battles/wars: Capture of Carolusborg (1658); Assault on Copenhagen (1659); Battle of the Sound

Johann Philipp von Krusenstjerna (1626 – 1659) was a German soldier who entered the service of the Swedish Africa Company.

== Biography ==
He was born to Philipp Crusius and Barbara Voigt around 1626, probably in Gottorf where his father was working for Frederick III, Duke of Holstein-Gottorp. He accompanied his father on the journey to Persia in 1635–1645 alongside Adam Olearius. He joined the Brotherhood of the Blackheads in 1649 in Reval. He was the one who arranged the family's introduction to the Swedish House of Nobility in 1650. Due to a conflict with the Kruuse family about the name, he agreed to change the name to either Krusenstiern or some other non-prejudicial name.

Later, Krusenstierna became a military officer and subsequently began working for the Swedish Africa Company. After Henrik Carloff began building the colony in 1650, he was accused by the Swedish of commencing trade on his own, account. Carloff defended himself, saying he needed to cover his expenses. Nevertheless, he resigned in 1656 after coming to Stockholm. Krusenstjerna was appointed as the new governor and sailed to Cabo Corso, where he arrived in February 1656.

Carloff later deserted to Denmark, returning in January 1658 from Glückstadt harbor with the ship of same name, bringing Dano-Swedish War of 1657–1658 to African coasts. On January 27, 1658, Fort Carolusborg, which had only 16 combat-ready men, was captured. Krusenstierna was deposed and arrested, the company's assets (including approximately 185 kg of gold and several tons of ivory) as well as the ship Stockholm Slott were confiscated, and the area became part of the Danish Gold Coast. Krusenstjerna was taken captive aboard the ship Glückstadt.

The Danish occupation ended in 1659, and after the Treaty of Copenhagen in 1660 following the Northern War of 1655–1660, the colony would finally be returned, and Krusenstierna was reinstated as governor. However, it turned out that Carloff's subordinate officer Samuel Smidt had already sold the colony to Dutch West India Company on the night of April 15, 1659 and disappeared with the money, believing Denmark was conquered by Sweden.

Krusenstierna was released as early as June 18, 1658, but never returned to Cabo Corso. Instead, he participated later that same year in the siege of Copenhagen. He was aboard a Swedish naval vessel during the Battle of the Sound against the Dutch on October 29, 1658. Krusenstierna died in 1659 at Kronborg Castle and was buried in St. Mary's Church in Helsingør.

== Family ==
He was married to Maria Usselinck from Holland, who was still living in 1688 in Holland. They had a son Philipp Johann who was living in Holland as well.

== Sources ==
- Nørregård, Georg (1966). Danish Settlements in West Africa, 1658-1850. Translated by Mammen, Sigurd. Boston University Press.
