= Swedish Gold Coast =

Swedish colony in present-day Ghana

Swedish Gold Coast Cabo Corso Svenska Guldkusten
- 1650–1658; 1660–1663
- Flag of Sweden

- Swedish Gold Coast (Ghana)
- Status: Colony of Sweden
- Capital: Fort Carolusborg
- Common languages: Swedish
- Administrator
  - 1650–1655: Henrik Carloff
  - 1655–1658: J. F. von Krusenstierna
  - 1658–1662: Occupation
  - 1662–1663: Tönnies Voss
- Historical era: Colonial period
  - Established: 22 April 1650
  - Partial Danish capture: 27 January 1658
  - Partial Dutch occupation: Mar 1659 – Dec 1660
  - Futu occupation (on Swedish behalf): Dec 1660 – Dec 1662
  - Dutch capture: 22 April 1663
  - Formal Swedish relinquishment: 22 July 1667
Preceded by	Succeeded by
1650: Futu Kingdom; 1660: Dutch Gold Coast	1658: Danish Gold Coast; 1663: Dutch Gold Coast
- Today part of: Ghana; Togo

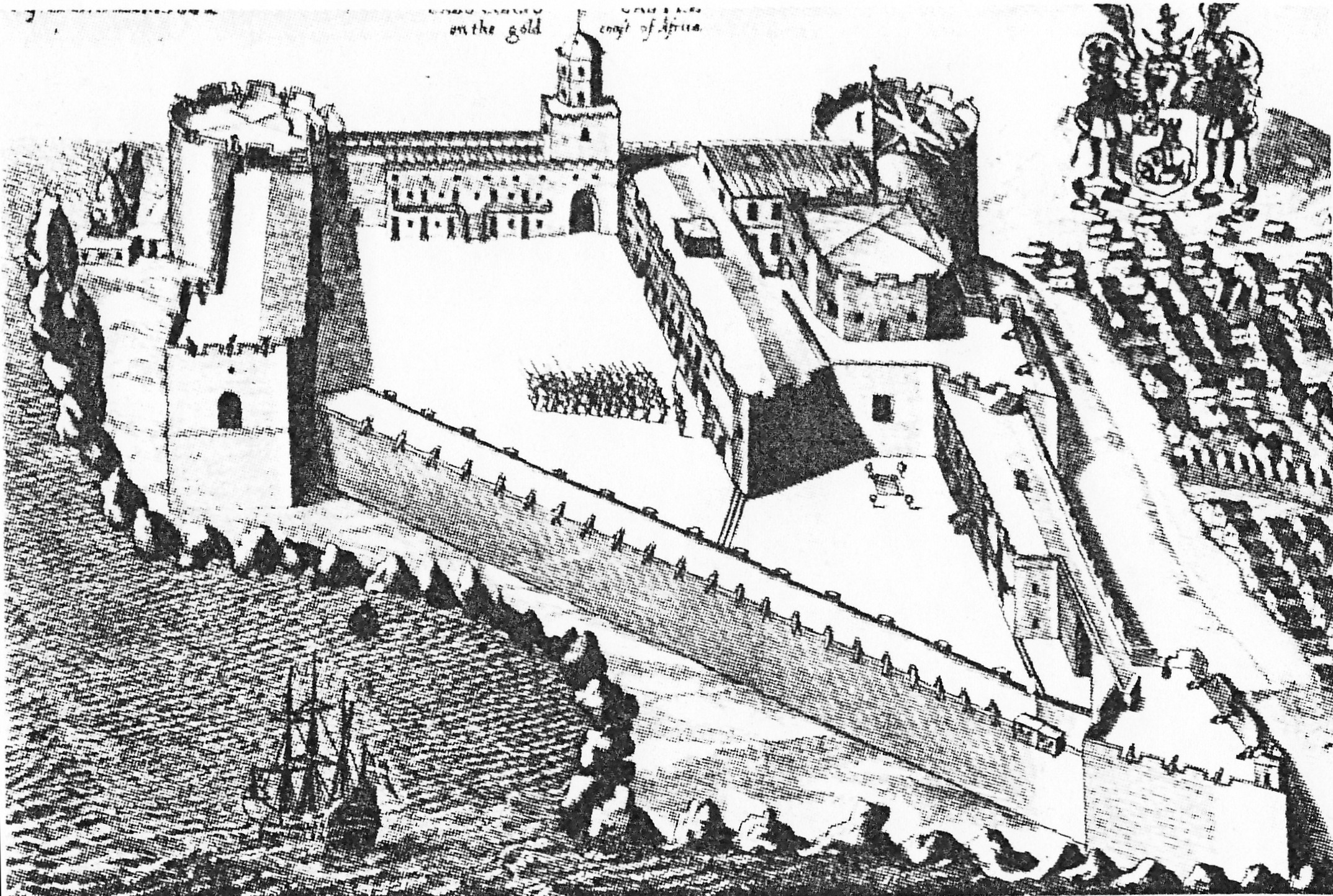
Fort Carolusborg, built on the initiative of Carloff

The Swedish Gold Coast (Swedish: Svenska Guldkusten) was a Swedish colony founded in 1650 by the Swedish Africa Company and Hendrik Carloff on the Gulf of Guinea in present-day Ghana in Africa. Under Swedish control for eleven years, it disappeared for good in April 1663 when it became part of the Dutch Gold Coast.

== History ==
Following the foundation of the Swedish Africa Company (1649) by Louis de Geer, an expedition under the command of Hendrik Carloff was sent to Africa in 1650. Carloff made a treaty with the Akan King of Futu (also Feta) on selling some areas of land. On 22 April 1650, the Swedish Gold Coast was founded and Carloff became its first administrator. In 1652, the foundations were laid of the Fort Carlsborg.

In 1656, Johan Filip von Krusenstierna (brother of the great-grandfather of Adam Johann von Krusenstern) was appointed the new Governor. This enraged Carloff. He left Cabo Corso only to return on 27 January 1658 on the Danish Privateer Glückstadt. Fort Carlsborg was seized and made part of the Danish Gold Coast colony.

King Charles X Gustav of Sweden made this one of his reasons to go to war with Denmark-Norway. After the Treaty of Copenhagen in 1660, Cabo Corso Castle was to be returned to Swedish administration. However, it then was revealed that Carloff's associate Samuel Schmidt (Smith, Smit) had already illegally sold the colony in April 1659 to the Dutch West India Company on his own, and had disappeared with the gold to Angola.

Later on, the local population started a successful uprising against their new masters, and in December 1660, the King of the Akan people subgroup-Futu again offered Sweden control over the area. A new expedition was sent to the colony which remained under Swedish administration only for a short period. Von Krusenstierna was reappointed as administrator.

On 20 April 1663, the capital Fort Carlsborg and Fort Christiansborg were again seized by the Dutch after a long defense under the Swedish commander Anton (Tönnies) Voss.

On 9 May 1664, the Dutch controlled area again was seized by Robert Holmes on behalf of the English Royal African Company. Swedish claims to the colony were later formally relinquished in the 1667 Treaty of Breda.

== Geography ==
The colony consisted of only a few forts and trading posts scattered around Cabo Corso (present-day Cape Coast) along the coast on the Gulf of Guinea in what later would become the British Gold Coast then Ghana. The eastern section of the colony later swapped hands from the German Empire (where it had noticeably expanded northward) to France, and then later gained independence as Togo.

The colony consisted of the following fortifications and trading posts (factories).

Place in Ghana	Fort name	Founded/ Occupied	Ceded	Comments
Cape Coast, Central Region	Fort Carlsborg	1650, 1660	1658, 1663	Headquarter. Also known as Carolusborg and Cape Coast Castle. Under Swedish administration 22 April 1650 – January/February 1658, and again 10 December 1660 – 22 April 1663.
Anomabu, Central region	Fort William	1650	1657	Also known as Annamabo
Butri near Sekondi-Takoradi, Western region	Fort Batenstein	1650	1656	Also known as Batensteyn
Osu, Ghana in Accra	Fort Christiansborg	1652	1658	Also known as Osu Castle. Captured by the Danes in 1658.
Sekondi-Takoradi, Western region	Fort Witsen	1653	1658	Also known as Taccorari
Beyin, Western region	Fort Apollonia	1655	1657	

The following factories were also held:

- Gemoree Factory
- Accara Factory

== Colonial heads ==
Each of the three Swedish administrators had a different gubernatorial title:

- Director: Hendrik Carloff, 22 April 1650 – 1655
- Governor: Johann Philipp von Krusenstjerna (son of Philipp Crusius), 1655 – 27 January 1658
- Danish occupation: 27 January 1658 – Mar 1659
- Dutch occupation: Mar 1659 – 10 December 1660
- Futu occupation (nominally Swedish): 10 December 1660 – 1662
- Commander: Tönnies Voss 16 March 1662 – 22 April 1663

== Sources ==
- WorldStatesmen.org: Swedish Gold Coast
- about the forts
