= Swedish Africa Company =

Swedish trading company, founded in 1649

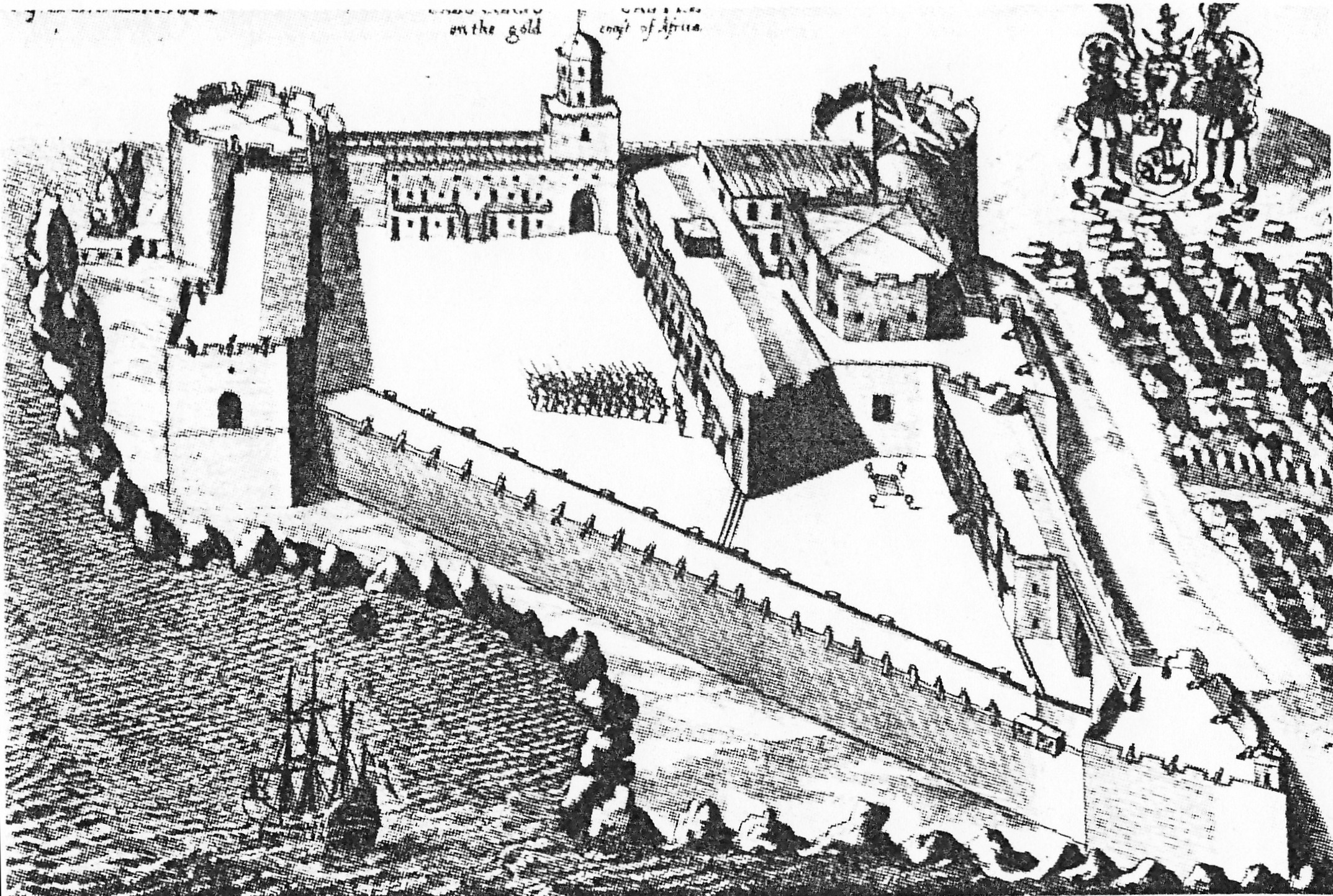
- Fort Carolusborg
- Founded: 1649
- Founder: Louis De Geer
- Defunct: 1663
- Headquarters: Hamburg, Stade, Gothenburg
- Key people: Laurens De Geer, Hendrik Carloff,
- Products: tobacco, sugar, gold and African slaves

The Swedish Africa Company (Swedish: Svenska Afrikanska Kompaniet) was a Swedish trading company, founded in 1649 on the initiative of the Walloon-Swedish merchant Louis De Geer and his son Laurens, for whom Sweden had become a second home. The primary interest of the company was the trade on the Swedish Gold Coast, primarily gold and ivory, which was resold in Hamburg or Amsterdam. The company's role in the slave trade was limited by its lack of access to American markets. During its existence it transported 300-400 slaves to the Portuguese sugar plantations on São Tomé.

== History ==
In 1648 De Geer's charter on exporting Swedish copper ended. Along with his son Laurens, and with a royal charter of Christina I of Sweden he founded the Swedish Africa Company, but moved its base from Gothenburg to Stade. The company was founded after Hendrik Carloff, a former high-ranking administrator of the Dutch West India Company, had offered his help, promoting his good relation with a local chief.

Carloff was hired for three years as commander and director at a salary of one hundred guilders and an ounce of gold per month to cover the charges. He embarked on the Elbe and thence sailed to Africa. He arrived at the Gold Coast on 22 April 1650. Carloff signed a contract for the purchase of land with the chief of Efutu. There was a conflict with the Company of Merchants Trading to Guinea negotiating with Henniqua, a cousin of King of the Fetu about an English trading post. On 28 May 1650 both Sweden and the English signed a treaty with the chief. The English obtained the right to trade for only half a year.

Carloff occupied Butre in 1650, Annemabo in 1651 and Orsou in 1652. On his return in September 1652 during the First Anglo-Dutch War, Carloff and his ships Christina and Northcoping, although neutral parties, became entangled in the conflict and were seized and taken to Plymouth. His ships were transporting about twenty bags of gold and over 10,000 elephant teeth. The gold rings, necklaces and bracelets were taken to the Tower of London. Meanwhile, his men started building Fort Carolusborg and conquered Tacorary in 1653. In Sweden Carloff was promoted to general and knighted on 3 May 1654 under the name Carloffer. It seems he occupied Jumore (Fort Apollonia) and Cabo in 1655. In 1656 Fort Batenstein was recaptured by the Dutch. In 1656 Carloff was accused of private trade. Johann Philipp von Krusenstjerna (1626–1659) took over the post of governor. Annoyed, Carloff left the colony and deserted to Denmark on 27 March 1657.

He then founded the Danish Africa Company and recaptured Carolusburg from the Swedes. Because of the Dano-Swedish War he ordered to sell Carolusborg to the Dutch if the garrison entered into trouble.

The establishment of both the Swedish and Danish Africa Company should be seen in the light of the mismanagement of the Dutch West India Company. This company went bankrupt in both 1636 and 1647, and was eventually dissolved in 1674. Both the Swedish and the Danish company were founded by Dutchmen who tried to evade the West India Company's monopoly and used the company's mismanagement to make a private profit.

The Swedish Africa Company was formally abolished in 1663, after the West India Company paid compensatory damages to the Swedes.
