= Louis De Geer (1587–1652) =

Dutch politician and merchant (1587–1652)

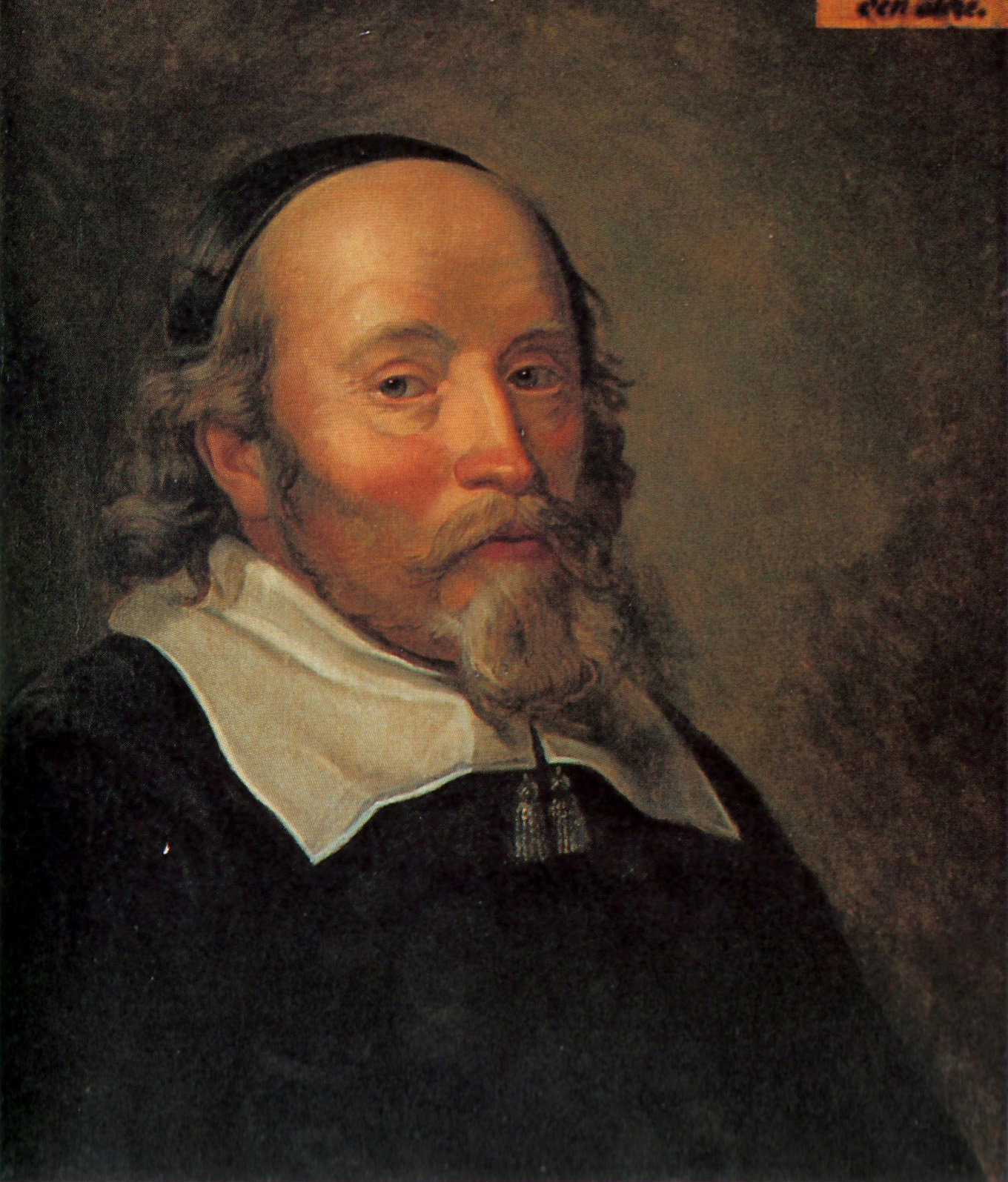
- Portrait by David Beck, c. 1650
- Born: 17 November 1587; Liège, Prince-Bishopric of Liège
- Died: 19 June 1652 (aged 64); Amsterdam, Dutch Republic
- Occupations: Entrepreneur; banker; industrialist; slave trader
- Known for: Pioneering Swedish industry and Sweden's involvement in the Atlantic slave trade

Louis De Geer (17 November 1587 – 19 June 1652) was a Walloon-Swedish entrepreneur, banker, industrialist and slave trader, who was part of the prominent De Geer family. A pioneer of foreign direct investment in the early modern period, De Geer is considered to be both the father of Swedish industry for introducing Walloon blast furnaces to Sweden and the father of the Swedish slave trade for pioneering Sweden's involvement in the Atlantic slave trade. Furnaces owned by De Geer produced cannons for German Protestants and the Dutch Navy and the Dutch East and West India Companies.

== Early life ==
De Geer was born in Liège, a city in the Prince-Bishopric of Liège. He was the son of the industrialist and merchant Louis de Geer de Gaillarmont (1535–1602), and his wife Jeanne de Neille (1557–1641). His family was of Walloon origin and his father came from Liège. His father had previously been married in 1563 to Maria de Jalhéa, who died in 1578. In 1592, one of De Geer's half-sisters, Marie de Geer (1574–1609) married Elias Trip (1569–1636), a Dutch merchant and a director of the Dutch East India Company who lived in Dordrecht. Presumably due to ongoing turmoil in the Prince-Bishopric of Liège as well as his conversion to Protestantism, de Gaillarmont sold his properties in Liège in 1595 and followed his daughter to Dordrecht, where since 1589 a neighborhood populated by merchants from Liège had existed. In 1603, De Geer's sister, Margaretha de Geer (1583–1672) married Jacob Trip (1575–1661), brother and partner of Elias, further cementing the relationship between the two merchant families.

== Early career ==
During his time in Dordrecht, De Geer studied under Dutch Calvinist theologian Johannes Polyander. From 1605 to 1608, De Geer trained as coppersmith in Roanne in France, after which he started his first business in La Rochelle. Returning to Dordrecht in 1611 he associated himself with his brothers-in-law. In 1612, he married Adrienne Gérard (c. 1590–1634), also originally from Liège, with whom he had 16 children. Having earned a fortune as a banker and industrialist he moved his family to Amsterdam in 1615. Owing to his extensive travels he received a good education in business.

== Later career and death ==
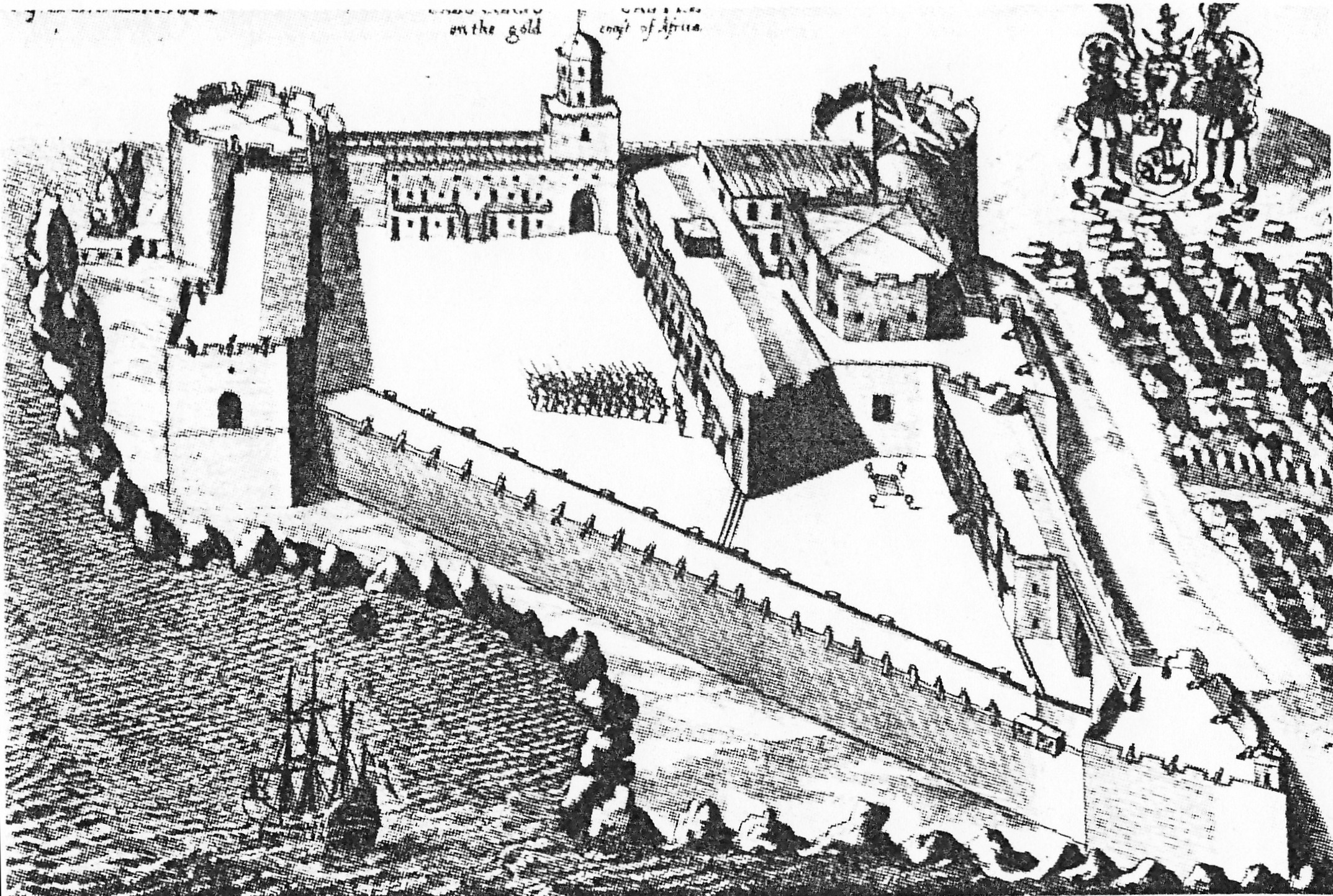
Fort Carolusborg, a Ghanaian slave castle constructed by the Swedish Africa Company

With the outbreak of the Thirty Years' War, the demand for weapons in Europe increased enormously. In 1618, De Geer delivered weapons to Swedish King Gustavus Adolphus. Impressed by his business instincts, the Swedish government allowed him to lease estates near Finspång in the province of Östergötland. Before long, De Geer had established a profitable workshop industry there. In 1623 he was active in a Swedish trading company. The Swedish government continued to support him and De Geer received the official monopoly on the copper and iron trade in Sweden. De Geer, due to his businesses in the country, eventually immigrated to Sweden in 1627. By doing so, he hoped to avoid paying the Dano-Norwegian Sound Tolls on all foreign merchantmen crossing the Sound. In 1634, De Geer bought the Huis met de Hoofden, a canal house on the Keizersgracht in Amsterdam. His wife died after giving birth to their sixteenth child.

In 1640, De Geer moved to Sweden again and was ennobled by the Swedish Crown. Thanks to his accrued wealth and status as a noble, De Geer was able to purchase three-quarters of leased farmlands on his Östergötland estates. As of 2011 his estate in Stockholm houses the Dutch embassy in Sweden. In the employ of Swedish statesman Axel Oxenstierna, De Geer travelled to Amsterdam to support the Swedish war effort in the Torstenson War against Denmark–Norway. Upon the outbreak of war in 1644, De Geer singlehandedly outfitted a fleet of Swedish ships for use against the Danish navy. The fleet contained thirty-two fully manned ships each with a full marine complement, with which Sweden was able to capture the island of Fehmarn.

A year after the war ended in 1646, De Geer organized a Swedish trading expedition to Africa. The following year the expedition returned to Sweden, bringing home sugar, gold, ivory and enslaved Africans, which had been purchased from the Gold Coast; De Geer gifted four enslaved Africans to Oxenstierna. After De Geer's monopoly on the Swedish copper trade expired in 1648, he founded the Swedish Africa Company the next year, which led outraged citizens in Amsterdam to riot. The company was founded to engage in the triangular trade and traded in plate copper, iron, gold, ivory, slaves, tobacco, sugar, silver and salt, representing Sweden's first foray into the Atlantic slave trade. In 1650, an expedition by slave trader Hendrik Carloff on behalf of the company founded the Swedish Gold Coast to conduct trade with local African kingdoms. In 1652, De Geer fell ill during a voyage to Sweden, and returned to Amsterdam, where he died. He was buried in the family grave in the Augustijnenkerk in Dordrecht.

== Legacy ==
In 2014, Swedish artist Carl Johan De Geer (a direct descendant of Louis) organized an exhibition about him in the city of Norrköping, Sweden, titled "Reflections on the barbaric 17th century". The exhibition focused on Louis' involvement in Swedish industry and slave trading. In an Norrköpings Tidningar article, Carl noted how the legacy of his ancestor had impacted him, noting that he had been publicly confronted about Louis' involvement in slave trading in addition to receiving a phone call asking whether or not he would be interested in renovating Fort Carolusborg, a Ghanaian slave castle constructed by the Swedish Africa Company. Carl also received a phone call from a Brazilian man with the De Geer surname whose ancestors had been enslaved and transported by the Swedish Africa Company to Brazil. In response to these developments, Carl publicly made plans to construct a miniature model of Fort Carolusborg in Norrköping, as part of an effort to overturn a "romanticized view of the Swedish 17th-century".
