= Hendrik Carloff =

17th century European adventurer

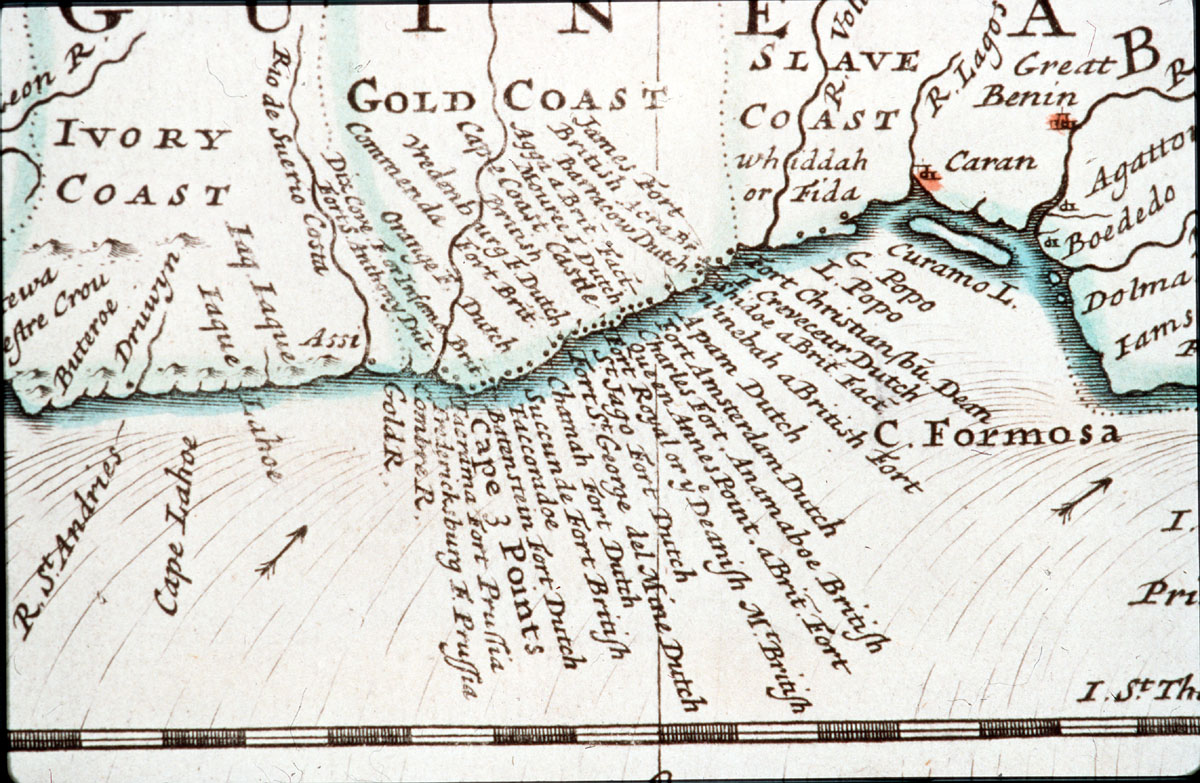
Forts of the Gold Coast (map circa 1700)

Hendrik Carloff, Caerloff or Caarlof was an adventurer and slave trader active in the 17th century. Carloff began his career as a cabin boy but rose to become a commander and governor appointed by the Dutch West India Company and Danish or the Swedish Africa Company on the Gold Coast. Between 1676 and 1677, he was Governor of Tobago.

== Life ==
Not much is known about Carloff's early life. He was born, according to his own testimony, in the Duchy of Finland. In 1637, he was employed by the Dutch West India Company in Dutch Brazil, first as a soldier and then as a writer. In May 1641, John Maurice of Nassau-Siegen sent an expedition to Luanda, which was occupied. They installed a Governor of Angola. He arrived in August and October in São Tomé which was conquered, and the Portuguese reign in Africa was temporarily broken. (In 1642 the Dutch and the local chiefs signed the Treaty of Axim). From 1645-1649 Carloff served at Fort Elmina and Fort Nassau (Ghana) in Mori. In 1648 he managed to pry a commitment from the chief of the Efutu on the purchase of land. With a feigned illness Carloff, who had profound and personal knowledge of the power structure in Axim, went back to Europe in the hope someone might be interested in his plan.

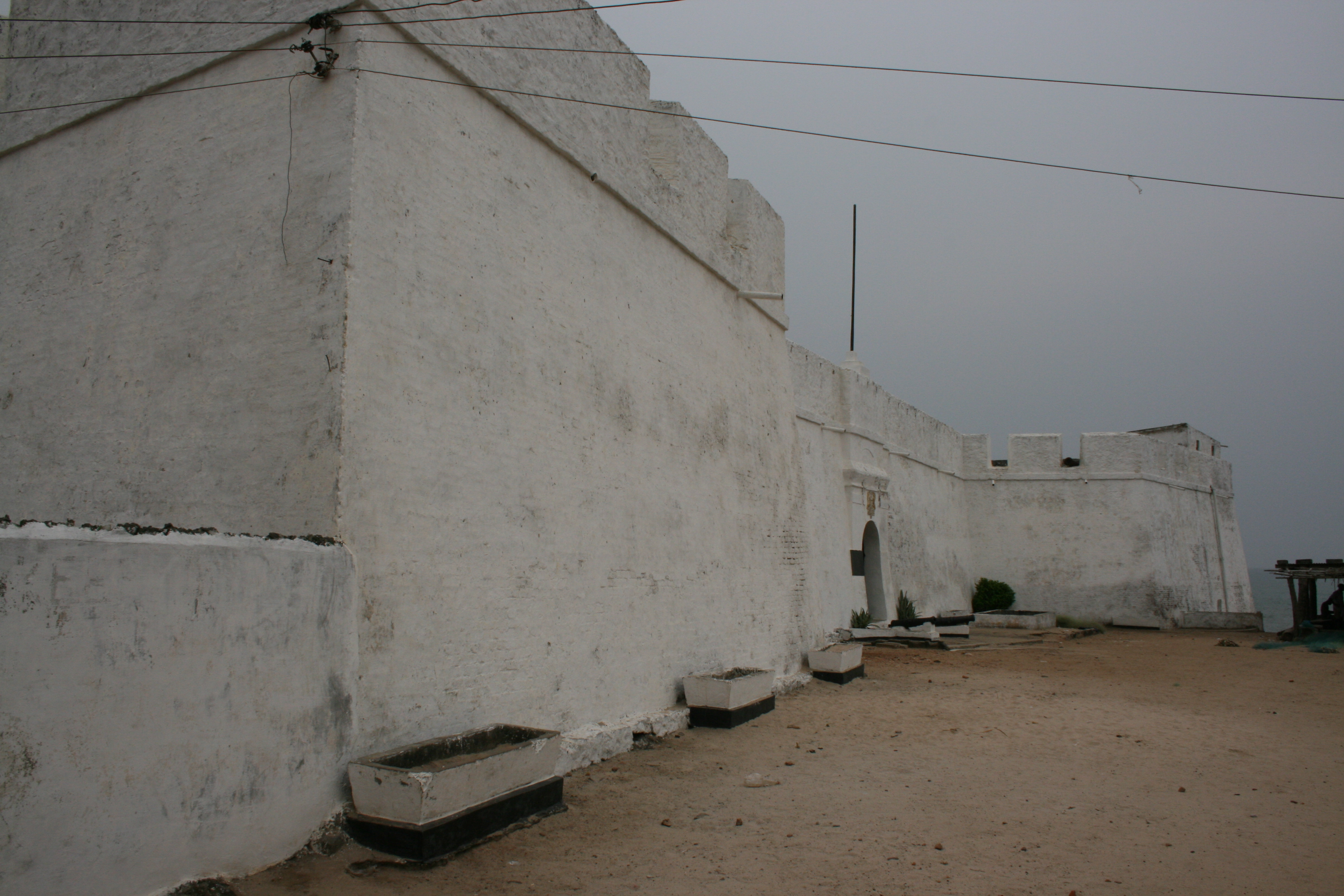
Anomabu castle.

After twelve years with the WIC he offered his service to Louis de Geer who shortly afterwards founded the pseudo-Swedish Africa Company in Stade. He was hired for three years as commander and director at a salary of one hundred guilders and an ounce of gold per month to cover the charges. He was embarking on the Elbe and thence sailed to West Africa. He arrived at the Gold Coast on 22 April. Carloff signed a contract for the purchase of land with the chief of Efutu. There was a conflict with the English Company of Merchants Trading to Guinea negotiating with Henniqua, a cousin of King of the Efutu about an English trading post. On 28 May 1650, the Swedish and English both signed a treaty with the chief, with the latter obtaining the right to trade for half a year.

Carloff occupied Butre in 1650, Anomabu in 1651, and Orsou in 1652. On his return, in September 1652 Carloff and his ship Christina were seized and taken to Plymouth. His ship was transporting about twenty bags of gold and 6,500 elephant teeth. The gold rings, necklaces and bracelets were taken to the Tower of London. Meanwhile, the Swiss Isaac Melville, his successor started building Fort Carolusborg and the conquest of Takoradi in 1653. In Sweden, Carloff was promoted to general and knighted on 3 May 1654 under the name Carloffer. The Swedes occupied Jumore (and constructed Fort Apollonia) and Cabo in 1655. In 1656 Fort Batenstein was recaptured by the Dutch. Johann Philipp von Krusenstjerna (1626–1659) took over the post of governor. Carloff left annoyed the colony and deserted to Denmark on 27 March 1657.

=== Danish Africa Company ===
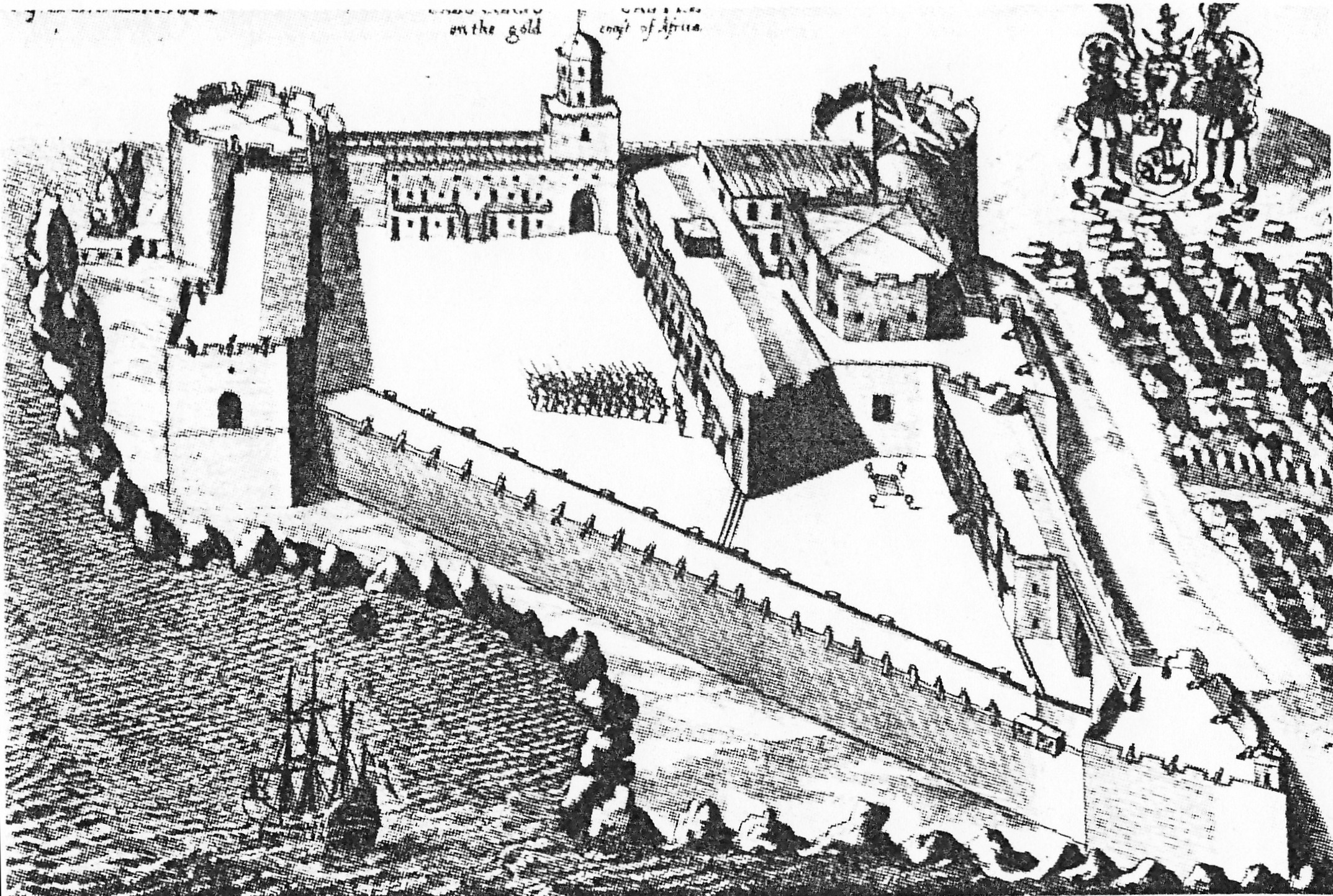
Fort Carolusborg (1682), built on the initiative of Carloff

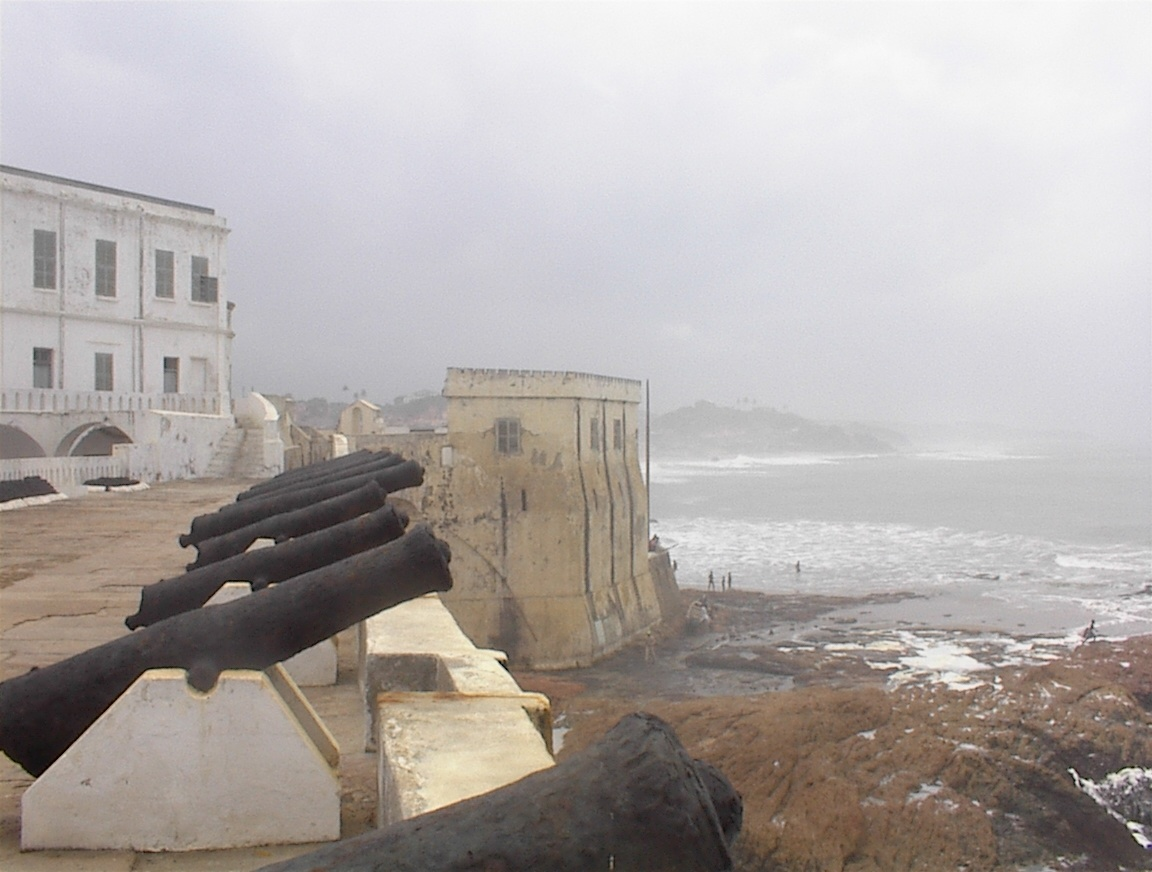
Fort on the Gold Coast (2003)

On 27 March 1657 Carloff offered his services to King Frederick III of Denmark. Frederick and the Danish Privy Council had approved his desire to carry out these operations during the first war against Sweden 1657-58. From 1657-1662 he was Director-General of the Danish Africa Company, which was founded by a patent for 25 years. Carloff held for 25,000 guilders shares herein. In December 1657 he left the port of Emden on the ship called "Glückstadt" with the mission to thwart Sweden The ship, which was equipped with 18 cannons and 48 crew members, arrived on 25 January 1658 east of Fort Carolusborg that was captured after two days, when the gate was opened in the morning. Von Krusenstierna was arrested; the business assets (including about 185 kg of gold and several tons of ivory) and the ship "Stockholm Lock" were confiscated. The Swedish trading post and the men became part of the Danish Africa Company. For King Charles X Gustav of Sweden, this was a reason to stop the peace talks with Denmark.

Carloff appointed Samuel Schmidt (or Smith) to manage the trading post and left the trading post with two ships, one of them hijacked from Sweden. On 8 June, he arrived in Glückstadt where the Swedish ambassador tried to arrest him. Carloff sent the gold secretly from Harlingen to Amsterdam. On 10 March 1659, he signed a contract with the Danish Admiralty in Groningen. On 28 March he was appointed in Hamburg as governor of the "Glückstädter Afrikanische Kompanie". In order to give the whole the presence of a foreign company, there were two Hamburg merchants involved, but most participants were Amsterdammers, and the vessels were equipped there according to Lieuwe van Aitzema.

The Treaty of Roskilde or the Treaty of Copenhagen (1660) determined that the fort would be returned to Sweden, but when it appeared that Schmidt sold on 16 April 1659 all Danish possessions at the WIC Director Jasper van Heussen commissioned Carloff after it became known that Denmark was occupied by Sweden during the Dano-Swedish War (1657-1658). When the Fetu got through what had happened the WIC fort was attacked by about 2,000 warriors with hand grenades - from the fort thrown bottles filled with gunpowder and burning wicks - could be deducted. Schmidt had instructions or ran off with some of the gold, but also a certain Jan Christiaansz. Canter did not have clean hands.

In 1659, Carloff was in conflict with the Dutch WIC about his possessions and the gold. At that time he was living in Haarlem. He threatened to work for the British. The WIC planned to murder the brother of the king Fetu and an attack on the fort Carolus Borg. Isaac Coymans briefed the plans to the Director of the Danish trading post. Coymans was sentenced. Carloff married Sophia Felicitas von Wolzogen. In 1660 he bought a house on Keizersgracht, that had been rented out to the chemist Johann Rudolf Glauber, and almost next to Jan Valckenburgh, his former colleague on the Gold Coast.

=== French West India Company ===
In 1662 he sailed to Angola and the West Indies; in 1664 to Cayenne and Guadalope. In 1665 he was appointed by Jean-Baptiste Colbert as a counselor for the French West India Company. He signed a contract on 8 February in Amsterdam to bring African slaves to the French West Indies in the next six years; for this merchandise, he received sugar in payment, shipped to France. On 19 August 1666, he lost a ship that was waiting for favorable winds in the Holmes's Bonfire, the infamous attack by Robert Holmes. There were approximately 150-170 ships at anchor. His crew escaped the burning ship and sailed to Harlingen, Friesland. The fire caused heavy damages, and the Amsterdam stock exchange remained closed for several days. In 1669, he sailed from Le Havre to Africa, where 1,000 slaves were embarked; over 750 could be delivered in Martinique. In 1672 he had 350 "heads" transferred to Guadeloupe.

=== Governor of Tobago ===
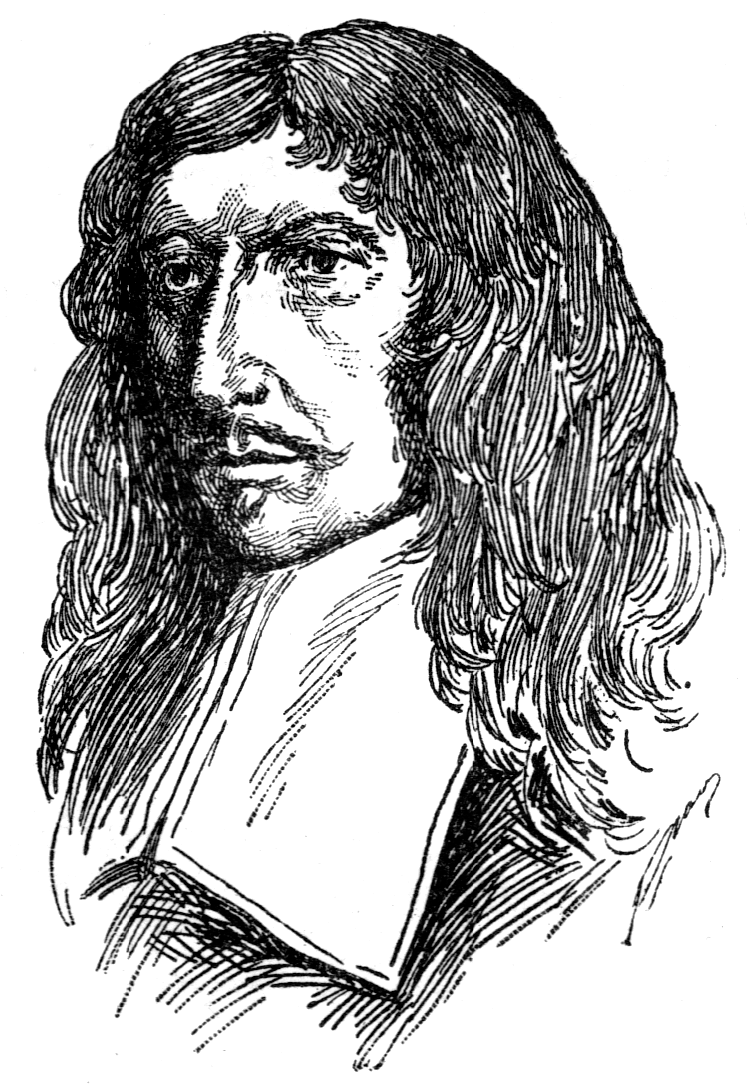
Jean II d'Estrées

In 1672 about 500 Dutch settlers arrived on the island of Tobago. On 18 December 1672, an English expedition captured six ships and 600 men after five or six hours of battle. The victorious English destroyed the settlement and the settlers were deported to Barbados; Tobago was abandoned. In September 1674 Carloff tried to become governor of Suriname. At the Treaty of Westminster (1674) the Dutch Republic received New Walcheren back from the English. Carloff had a plan to thwart the French shipping on the West Indies, and to populate the colony again. The plan was approved by the Admiralty of Amsterdam, and in 1676 Jacob Binckes sailed off. Carloff was appointed by King William III as commissioner-general the board was dedicated to him as soon as Tobago would be conquered.

On 21 February 1677 Admiral Jean d'Estrées arrived on the island with 24 ships and 1,000 men against some 700 soldiers, 100 settlers, and 15 vessels on the Dutch side. What followed is known as the action of March 1677; d'Estrées retreated to Grenada. On 6 December d'Estrées made another attempt to attack the colony. Contrary to expectations, he attacked the fortress from the landside. On 12 December a French cannonball caused a huge explosion at the gunpowder storage of the fortress, and about 250 men were killed. A small group escaped, the rest surrendered.

It is unclear what role Carloff played on the island. It seems that Carloff, who had been at odds with Binckes, did not meet expectations and was taken into custody. The records show little on the rest of the life of Carloff. He died in or after 1677.

== Sources ==
- K.H. Wirta (2018) Dark horses of business : overseas entrepreneurship in seventeenth-century Nordic trade in the Indian and Atlantic oceans
- Hendrik Jacob den Heijer (2011) Een dienaar van vele heren. De Atlantische carrière van Hendrick Caerloff. In: Het verre gezicht : politieke en culturele relaties tussen Nederland en Azië, Afrika en Amerika : opstellen aangeboden aan prof.dr. Leonard Blussé, p. 162-180.
- denstoredanske.dk
- Remonstrantie, aen de ... Staten Generael der Vereen. Nederlanden
