= Danish West India Company =

Dano-Norwegian chartered company

- Type: Incentive
- Industry: Chartered
- Founded: 11 March 1671; Denmark
- Defunct: 1 January 1776
- Fate: Disintegration

The Danish West India Company (Danish: Vestindisk kompagni) or Danish West India–Guinea Company (Det Vestindisk-Guineisk kompagni) was a Dano-Norwegian chartered company that operated out of the colonies in the Danish West Indies. It is estimated that 120,000 enslaved Africans were transported on the company's ships. Founded as the Danish Africa Company (Dansk afrikanske kompagni) in 1659, it was incorporated into the Danish West India Company in 1671.

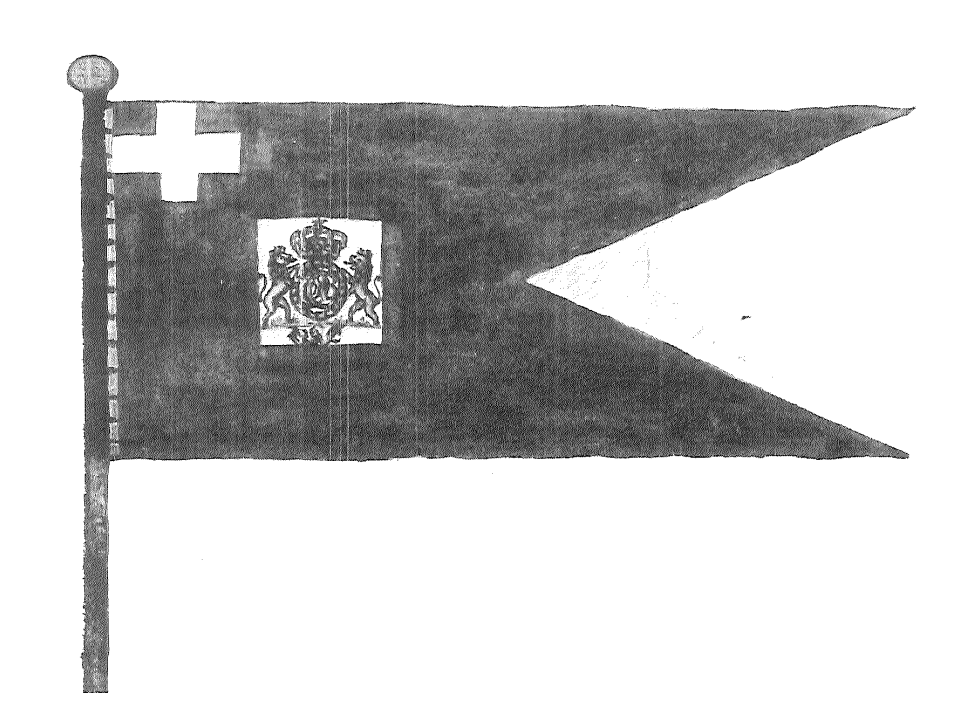
The flag of the West India-Guinea Company.

== History ==
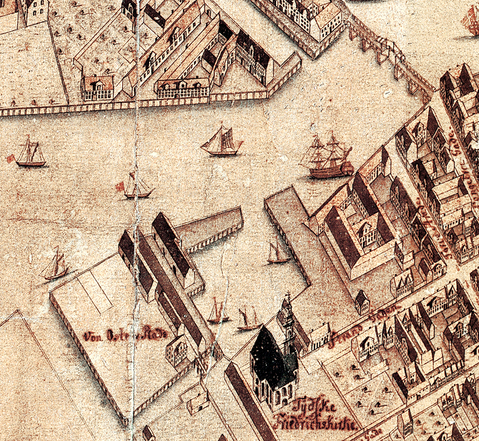
Map detail showing Danish West Indies Company's headquarters and dock in Christianshavn, Copenhagen

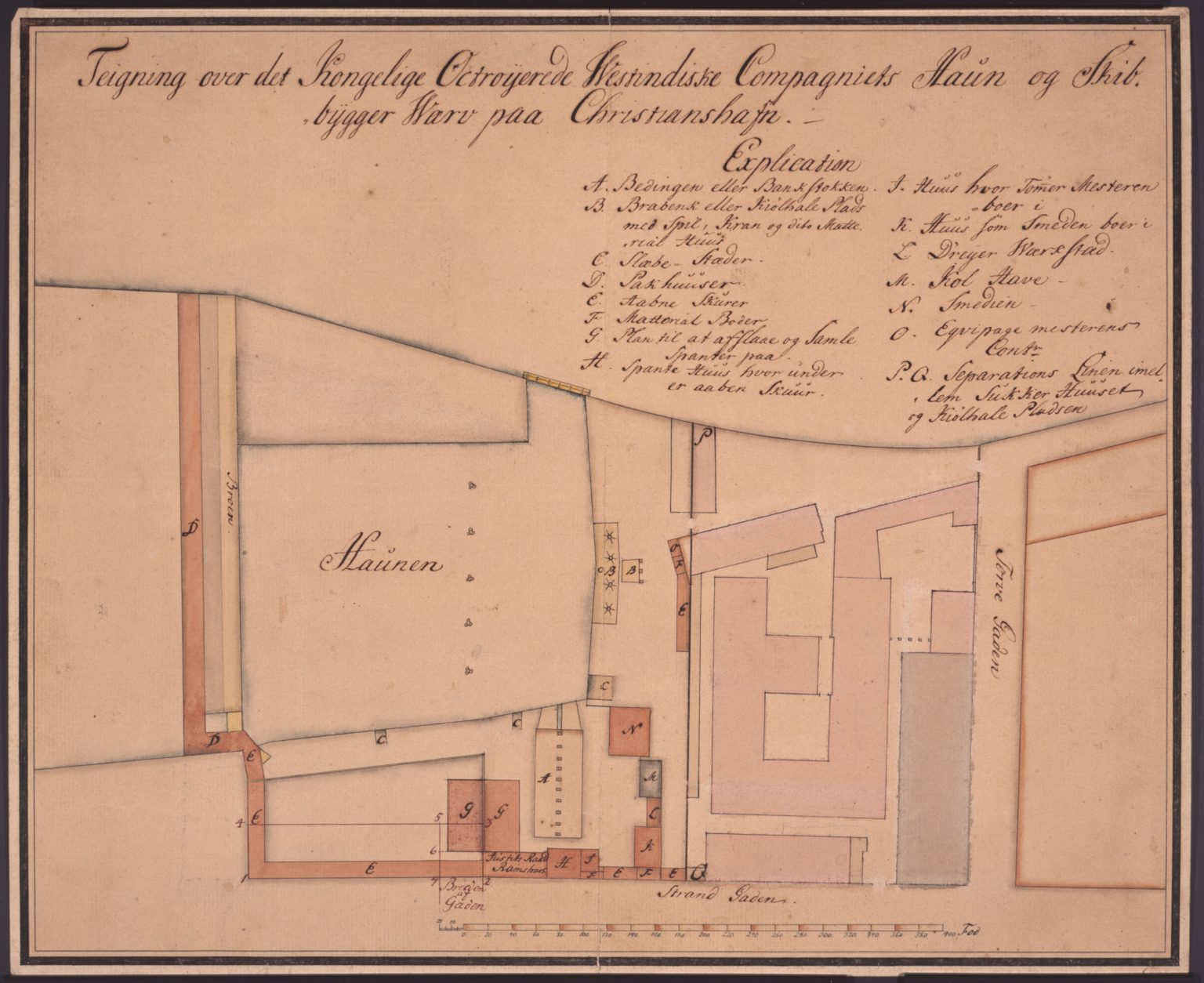
Map of the company's site in Copenhagen, 1754.

In March 1659, the Danish Africa Company was started in Glückstadt by the originally Finnish Hendrik Carloff; two Dutchmen, Isaac Coymans and Nicolaes Pancras; and two German merchants, Vincent Klingenberg and Jacob del Boe. Their mandate included trade with the Danish Gold Coast in present-day Ghana. In 1671 the Africa Company was incorporated in the Danish West India Company. The West India Company was organized on November 20, 1670, and formally chartered by King Christian V on March 11, 1671.

The Danes settled in St. Thomas in 1668. The first successful colonization of Sankt Thomas employed ships of the Royal Dano-Norwegian Navy, the yacht Den forgyldte Krone and the frigate Færøe (referring to the islands, but often erroneously translated as Pharaoh), but the company quickly began employing ships of their own, while occasionally relying on the royal navy for escorts and protection. From August 30, 1680, it became known as the West India–Guinea Company. At first, the company had difficulties being profitable, but eventually it began to increase revenue by raising taxes and bringing all colonial exports into Copenhagen directly. St. John was purchased in 1718 and St. Croix from the French in 1733.

In the 17th and 18th centuries, the company flourished from the North Atlantic triangular trade routes. Slaves from the Gold Coast of Africa were traded for molasses and rum in the West Indies.

=== Closure and revival ===
The company administered the colonies until 1754, when the Danish government's "Chamber of Revenues" took control. From 1760 to 1848, the governing body was known as Vestindisk-guineiske rente- og generaltoldkammer.

Frederik Bargum revived the company as Det Guineiske kompagni via Royal resolution of March 18, 1765, to maintain the trade with the Danish Gold Coast colonies. In November, they received the forts of Christiansborg and Fredensborg for 20 years. The company, however, never enjoyed a trade monopoly like the Dutch West India Company. Competition for trade remained among all Danish, Norwegian, Schleswig, and Holstein companies.

The financially troubled company was liquidated on November 22, 1776. In anticipation of this, the Dano-Norwegian government took control of the granted forts from August–September 1775. Bargum had fled the country to escape his creditors in 1774.

== Company ships ==
- Charlotte Amelie (1680s)
- Den Unge Tobias (Young Tobias, 1687)
- Røde Hane (Red Cock, 1687)
- Maria (1687)
- Pelicanen (The Pelican)
- Unity (1700s)
- Caroline (1750).
- William (1750).

== Bibliography ==
- Jensen, Niklas Thode; Simonsen, Gunvor (2016). "Introduction: The historiography of slavery in the Danish-Norwegian West Indies, c. 1950-2016". Scandinavian Journal of History. 41 (4–5): 475–494. doi:10.1080/03468755.2016.1210880. hdl:109.1.5/469ed487-ad15-4504-a969-8eb9a0ea0d17.

== See also ==
- Danish Asia Company
- Danish East India Company
- Fort Christiansborg
- List of governors of the Danish West Indies
- List of trading companies
