= Gold Coast (region) =

Historical region of West Africa

Coordinates: 5°27′N 0°58′W

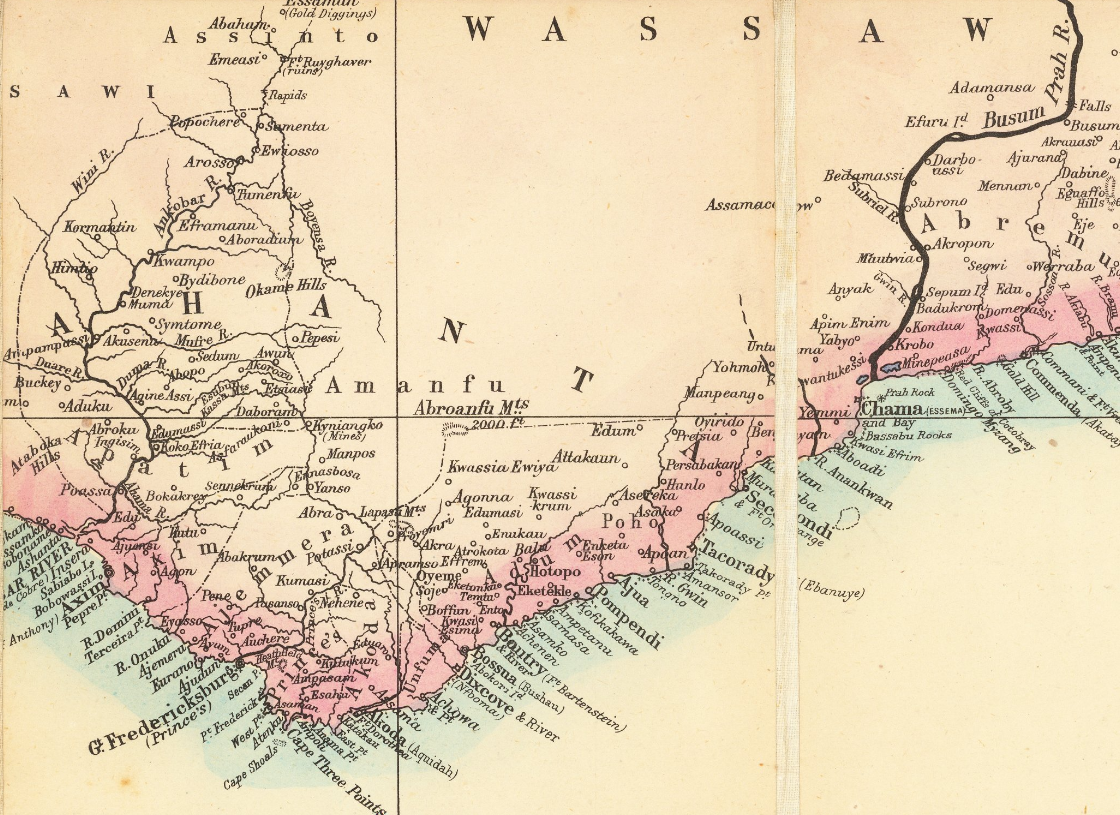
Map of the Gold Coast in 1873

The Gold Coast was the name for a region on the Gulf of Guinea in West Africa that was rich in gold, petroleum, and natural gas. This former region is now known as the country Ghana.

== Etymology and position ==
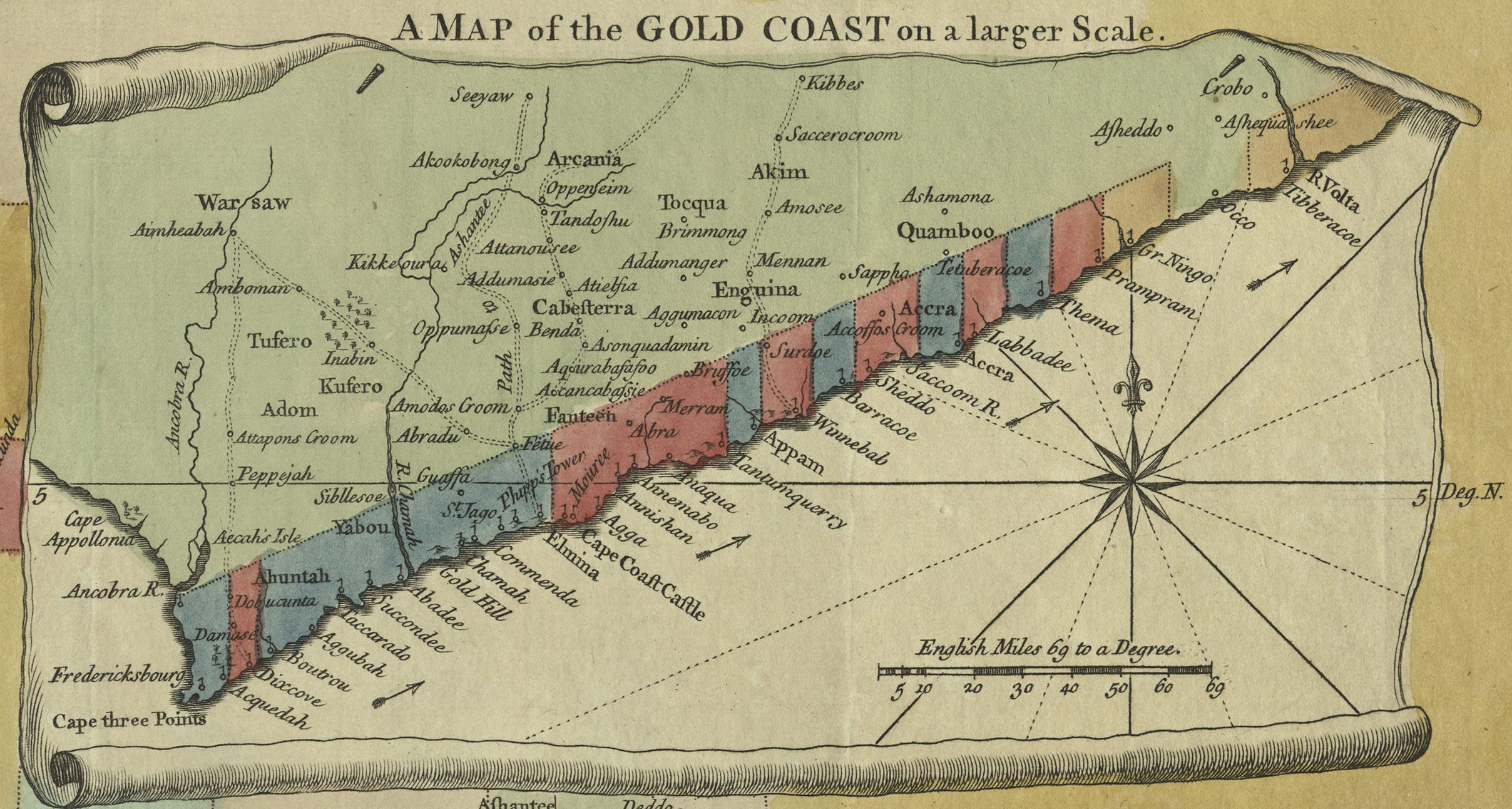
Richard William Seale's 1750 map of the Gold Coast

The Gold Coast, Slave Coast, Pepper Coast (or Grain Coast) and Ivory Coast were named after the main export resources found there, respectively.

Early uses of the term Gold Coast refer strictly to the coast and not the interior. It was not until the 19th century that the term came to refer to areas that are far from the coast.

The Gold Coast was to the east of the Ivory Coast and to the west of the Slave Coast.

== Territorial entities ==
Gold Coast region territorial entities were:

- Portuguese Gold Coast (1482–1642)
- Dutch Gold Coast (1598–1872)
- Swedish Gold Coast (1650–1658; 1660–1663)
- Couronian Gold Coast (1651–1661)
- Danish Gold Coast (1658–1850)
- Brandenburger Gold Coast and Prussian Gold Coast (1682–1721)
- British Gold Coast (1821–1957)

Ghana is the legal name for the region loosely referred to as the Gold Coast comprising the following four separate parts, which immediately before independence had distinct constitutional positions:

- the Gold Coast Crown Colony;
- the Ashanti Crown Colony;
- the Northern Territories of the Gold Coast Protectorate; and
- the Trust Territory of Togoland (under British administration).

The United Kingdom government was responsible for shepherding through the Ghana Independence Act 1957 with Charles Arden-Clarke. Lord Listowel explained that the name was chosen "in accordance with the wishes of the Gold Coastian population".

== History ==
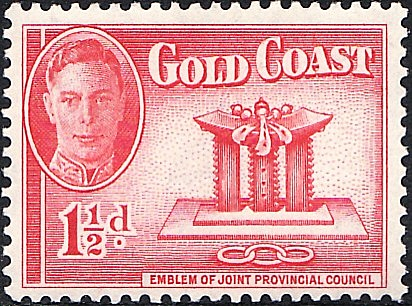
1930s Stamp Gold Coast Golden Stool with George VI.

Europeans reached this region of Africa in 1482, and for centuries afterwards, various European empires and trading companies set up trading posts, known as factories there. They used these colonies to exploit the resources rather than to settle large numbers of subjects. In the 15th century the Portuguese acquired 400-550 kilos (880-1,200 pounds) of gold per year from trade with the Akan people who lived in this region. Bono Manso was one of the earliest cities on the Gold Coast, predating European contact and had trade connections with the Mali and Songhai Empires. The European Age of Discovery circumnavigated the Sahelian empires' monopoly of the west African gold trade.

The Portuguese Gold Coast was the first claim. The Dutch arrived in 1598 and in 1642 incorporated the Portuguese territory into the Dutch Gold Coast. The Dutch stayed in the region until 1871, when the last of their settlements were bought by the British Gold Coast.

There was also the Brandenburger Gold Coast, which established a colony in the area in 1682. It later became the Prussian Gold Coast. In 1721 the Dutch purchased it. The Swedish Gold Coast settlements date to 1650. The Danes arrived in 1663 and later seized the Swedish territory and incorporated it into the Danish Gold Coast. In 1850 all of the settlements became part of the British Gold Coast.

In 1774 a London commercial expert references a witness that "the king of Guinea, the greatest city in all the countries of Negroland, has a mass of gold of thirty pounds weight as it was naturally produced in the mines which is completely pure, tough and malleable without having been smelted". The British had taken over all of Gold Coast by 1871. They captured more territory inland in the late 19th century after the Anglo-Ashanti wars. In 1957, the territory comprising the Gold Coast Crown Colony, the Ashanti Crown Colony, the Northern Territories of the Gold Coast Protectorate and British Togoland were united as an independent dominion within the British Commonwealth of Nations under the name Ghana.

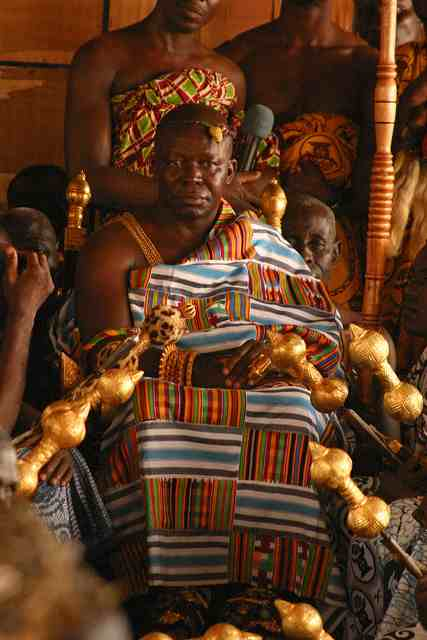
Picture of an Akan monarch, King Asantehene Osei Tutu II

== See also ==
- Birimian
- Convention People's Party
- Early history of Ghana
- Geology of Ghana
- Kwame Nkrumah
- United Gold Coast Convention and The Big Six
