= Philipp Crusius =

German jurist, diplomat and governor

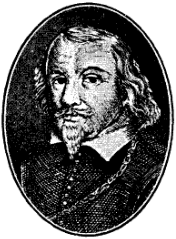

Governor of Reval
- In office December 19, 1659 – May 5, 1670
- Preceded by: Wilhelm von Ulrich
- Succeeded by: Jakob Staël von Holstein

Personal details
- Born: May 1, 1597 Eisleben, County of Mansfeld, Holy Roman Empire
- Died: April 10, 1676 (aged 78) Reval, Duchy of Estonia, Swedish Empire
- Children: Johann Philipp von Krusenstjerna
- Education: Leipzig University
- Profession: Jurist
- Noble Family: Von Krusenstierna
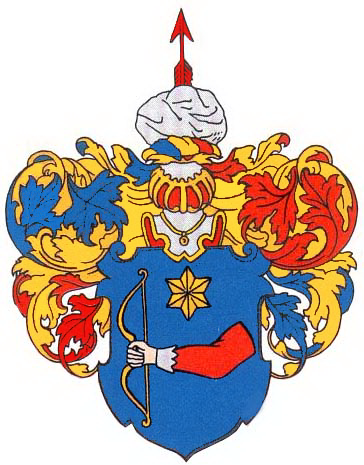
- Coat of Arms

Philipp Crusius (from 1649: von Kruus, from 1650: von Krusenstiern; May 1, 1597 – April 10, 1676) was a German jurist, diplomat, and administrative official.

== Life ==
Philipp Crusius was a son of the clergyman Johannes Crusius (1550-1616) and his wife Barbara, née Kreijer in Eisleben. He completed law studies at Leipzig University. As a licentiate of both laws, he later became court counselor to Count Ernst von Mansfeld, and was a legate to Albrecht von Wallenstein in Prague in 1621. He started from 1622 to work in the council of Frederick III, Duke of Holstein-Gottorp.

During the Thirty Years' War, Crusius served as a ducal negotiator and commissioner for Dithmarschen and Eiderstedt. In 1627, he entered the service of Emperor Ferdinand II and worked as a war commissioner in Wilster, Krempe and adjacent marsh lands May 1628 – 1629. In 1629, he took part in negotiating the Peace of Lübeck and traveled to Italy a year later on behalf of the Emperor in 1630 as legate.

Wallenstein sent Crusius to Gottorf in 1632 as legate, where he again worked for the Duke. Together with Otto Brüggemann, he joined a Gottorf group that was to negotiate a new trade route. In preparation for journeys to Russia and Safavid Iran, they met Axel Oxenstierna in Halle in early 1633. They then went to Stockholm and spoke with the Swedish Council of the Realm.

From November 1633 to April 1635, Crusius visited Moscow with the delegation, where negotiations with the Tsar resulted in a trade agreement. They then returned to their homeland and again negotiated with Oxenstierna in Hamburg. In October 1635, the group, together with Adam Olearius and Paul Fleming, undertook a diplomatic journey via Moscow, which was in the interest of the Persian silk trade, suffered shipwreck on the Estonian coast, traveled via the Volga and the Caspian Sea, and reached Isfahan. They could not achieve any negotiating successes and were back in Gottorf in August 1639. During the negotiations, Crusius, who probably understood how to act diplomatically skillfully, officially led the mission as the first envoy. In reality, however, Brüggemann had taken over the leadership and negatively influenced the trade project. Crusius continued to accompany the project as Holstein resident in Reval on June 4, 1640.

=== Career in Estonia ===
After the final failure of the negotiations in 1644, he joined the Brotherhood of the Blackheads there on November 1 same year. Crusius worked for the Swedish royal house and became the 1st Assessor at the Reval Castle Court in 1648. Raised to the nobility in 1649, he became the founder of the von Krusenstiern family. From 1651, he worked as a state and assistance councilor for the Swedish government of Estonia. In 1652/53, he participated as a negotiator in determining the borders between Russia and Ingermanland. In 1653, as an expert in Russian trade, he received a position as Commercial Director for Estonia and Ingermanland as well as Burgrave of Narva. Working closely with Erik Oxenstierna he championed a liberal approach to commerce that was forward-thinking for the era. His economic vision was documented in a series of detailed memoranda to the Swedish government in 1643, 1646, 1648, 1653, and 1660.

One of his most significant contributions was his approach to Russian transit trade through the Baltic ports. Rather than supporting the competing claims of individual cities (Reval, Narva, and Nyen) for exclusive staple rights, he proposed treating these cities and their trade routes as an integrated commercial network. He successfully lobbied for the reduction of customs duties on Russian transit trade to just 2% (1% license duty and 1% portorium) across all three ports, as codified in the customs regulations of July 31, 1648. He also helped negotiate the trade treaty between Reval and Swedish government representatives on March 24, 1648, which eliminated numerous restrictive practices dating back to the Hanseatic period that had hindered foreign merchants, both Russian and Western European.

He was a strong proponent of establishing manufacturing operations, particularly in Narva and Ingermanland. He recognized the strategic advantages of these locations, which had abundant access to Russian raw materials (hemp, flax, leather, hides, and tar), extensive forest resources, and the valuable water power from the Narva river falls. The promotional efforts by Crusius and other experts eventually yielded concrete results with the establishment of new manufacturing operations in the region.

As an envoy of Charles X Gustav, Crusius traveled to Moscow in 1655, where he was supposed to help negotiate the extension of the Treaty of Stolbovo, which, however, did not come about. From the beginning of the Russian-Swedish War until its end in 1658, Crusius was imprisoned. Afterward, he participated in the negotiations for the armistice in Vallisaari. He served as governor in Reval from December 19, 1659 to May 5, 1670. From 1670, he lived in retirement on his estates in Estonia. He died on April 10, 1676 in Reval.

== Work ==
His most enduring legacy in this area was the codification of Estonian law. Commissioned by the Estonian land councilors likely before 1648, he systematically collected and organized local legal norms from privilege letters and other sources into a comprehensive codex titled "Des Fürstenthums Ehsten Ritter- und Landrecht" (The Duchy's Most Honorable Knights and Land Rights) together with Caspar Meyer, secretary of the Estonian Knighthood. Although this legal code was never officially confirmed by Queen Christina after its submission on November 11, 1650, it became the de facto foundation for legal practice in Estonian courts until the 19th century. The code was so well-regarded that it continued to be used despite not being printed until 1821. This codification was confirmed by Charles XII of Sweden in 1699.

In 1648, Crusius also translated the Swedish city law and Kristofers landslag into German, making these legal frameworks accessible to the German-speaking Baltic populations. This work reflected his understanding of the need for consistent legal frameworks across different linguistic regions within the Swedish empire.

== Family ==
He married twice. He had 11 children, of whom 6 died very young. The youngest son Adolf Friedrich (1652-1687) is the ancestor of all living descendants: from his sons Ewert Philipp (1676-1746) and Adolf Friedrich (1679-1713) descend the Estonian and Swedish branches of the family (von Krusenstjern and von Krusenstjerna respectively).

1. Barbara Voigt – married in 1623, died in 1634
  - Johann Philipp von Krusenstjerna (1626-1659), commander of the Cape Coast Castle by the Gulf of Guinea
  - Maria Magdalena von Krusenstjerna (died 1687), from 1653 the wife of David Reimers (father of Werner von Rosenfeldt) and from 1668 the wife of Livonian captain Moritz von Breitholtz.
2. Maria Müller – daughter of the Reval merchant and councilor Johann Müller (died 1639) and Margaretha Pröbsting (died 1641); sister-in-law of Adam Olearius, married on 13 May 1639, died in 168
  - Maria Elisabeth Krusenstjerna, wife of Päädeva manor owner Ewert Wolmar von Wrangell (died 1695)
  - Axel Erich von Krusenstern (born 1648)
  - Adolf Friedrich von Krusenstern (1652-1687), Swedish military officer (captain), owner of Ohakvere and Hagudi manors, great-grandfather of Adam Johann von Krusenstern.
