= Von Krusenstierna =

Von Krusenstierna Swedish: Krusenstierna, Krusenstjern, Krusenstjerna Russian: Крузенште́рн
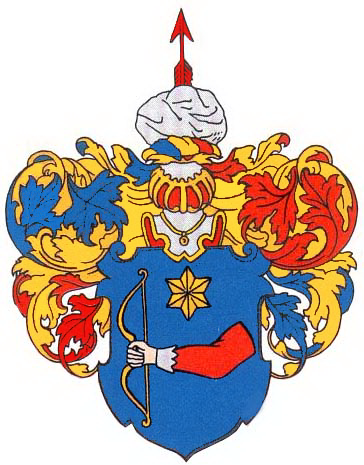
- Country: Germany; Sweden; Russia; Estonia
- Origin: Rothenburg, Saxony-Anhalt
- Founder: Philipp Crusius

Von Krusenstierna, also known as Krusenstern (Swedish: Krusenstierna, Krusenstjern, Krusenstjerna; Russian: Крузенште́рн) is the name of a Swedish-Estonian noble family. The family currently continues to exist in Sweden, Germany, Poland, Russia, the USA, Australia, and Canada.

== Origin ==
The family originates from the County of Mansfeld and traces its lineage to pastor Johannes Crusius (d. 1558) in Rothenburg an der Saale in Saxony-Anhalt. His son, the deacon magister Johannes Crusius (1550–1616) in Eisleben, was the father of Philipp Crusius (1597–1676) who became the Holstein resident in Reval in 1640 and entered Swedish service there. On March 9, 1649, he was elevated to Swedish nobility with the predicate "von Kruus" and in 1650 was introduced to the Swedish House of Knights as "Crusenstierna" thanks to his son Johann Philipp. Due to a conflict with the Kruuse family about the name, he agreed to change the name to either Krusenstiern or some other non-prejudicial name. When the Estonian noble registry was established, his family was entered into it on February 11, 1746.

However it was Johann Philipp's half-brother Adolf Friedrich (1652–1687) who was the ancestor of all living descendants: from his sons Ewert Philipp (1676–1746) and Adolf Friedrich (1679–1713) descend the Estonian and Swedish branches of the family.

== Estonian branch ==
Adolf Friedrich was the father of Ewert Philip von Krusenstierna (1676–1748), who was captured by the Russians at the Battle of Erastfer in 1701. After returning from captivity in 1722, he retired as a lieutenant colonel and became mannrichter (senior judge) in Estonia. He became the founder of an Estonian branch of the family, whose members held Haggud in Rappel which was donated by Charles X Gustav in 1659 to the family. They held the estate until 1919. This branch includes Adam Johann von Krusenstern (1770–1846). Several famous people such as John Shalikashvili, Friedrich von Bernhardi, Paul Demetrius von Kotzebue, Eduard Karlovich Dellingshausen, Aleksey Shakhmatov, Alexander von Kotzebue, Otto Friedrich Ignatius, Otto Pius Hippius and others were descended from this branch.

== Swedish branch ==
The Swedish line of the family descends from Evert Philipp's brother, Friedrich von Krusenstierna (1679–1713). After the latter's death in the Battle of Pälkäne in Finland and the death of his wife (Johanna Sidonia, née Wrangel), his mother Johanna Katharina (née von Taube) took her orphaned grandchildren into her care and fled with them from Russian-occupied Estonia to Sweden, where she remained after the conclusion of peace. Adolf Friedrich's son Mauritius Adolf von Krusenstierna (1707–1794) was an admiral and member of the State Council, and his grandson Sebastian von Krusenstierna (1760–1836), who rose to the rank of colonel in the navy, fought in the Russo-Swedish War of 1788–90, while his Russian-Estonian relative Adam Johann von Krusenstern fought on the opposite side. Sebastian's half-brother, Colonel Moritz Solomon von Krusenstierna (1746–1810), also took part in the same war. He made a number of trips to the East Indies and China, and then participated in the Battle of Hogland, in which Adam Johann participated on the opposite side. He was the great-grandfather of the famous writer Agnes von Krusenstjerna.

Others descended from this branch were:

- Edvard von Krusenstjerna (1841–1907), Swedish civil servant and politician
- Henning von Krusenstierna
- Isac von Krusenstierna
- Fredrik von Krusenstjerna (born 1958), Swedish filmmaker, producer and documentary filmmaker
- Maurits Peter von Krusenstierna (1766–1813), Swedish naval officer

== See also ==
- Adam Johann von Krusenstern (1770–1846), Baltic German admiral and explorer who circumnavigated the world in Russian service
