= Johann Rudolf Stadler =

Swiss clockmaker (1605–1637)

- Born: 1605; Zürich, Old Swiss Confederacy
- Died: 16 October 1637 (aged 31–32); Isfahan, Safavid Iran
- Cause of death: Execution
- Burial place: New Julfa Armenian Cemetery
- Occupations: Clockmaker, watchmaker
- Father: Erhard Stadler
- Relatives: Johann Rudolf Schmid von Schwarzenhorn (uncle); Otto Bruggeman (brother-in-law)

Johann Rudolf Stadler (1605 – 16 October 1637) was a Swiss Protestant clockmaker. He is mostly known for his life in Safavid Iran, where he worked as a prosperous watchmaker. He eventually fell victim to intrigue in relation to the death of a trespasser on his property, and was executed.

== Biography ==
A native of Zürich, Stadler was a son of a certain Erhard, a seller of stoves. In 1627, he left on a mission to Constantinople, the capital of the Ottoman Empire, for his uncle Johann Rudolf Schmid von Schwarzenhorn. There, he met the French traveller Jean-Baptiste Tavernier. Stadler and Tavernier subsequently travelled together to Isfahan, the capital of the Safavid Empire.

Stadler arrived in Safavid Iran in 1631 where he soon made a name for himself as watchmaker. Safavid Shah ("King") Safi (r. 1629–1642) was pleased by the watch that Stadler made for him while at Isfahan, and he was subsequently employed at court. Over the next three years, Stadler repaired all of the Shah's broken watches. Stadler became a wealthy man of high standing in the Safavid Empire, and married a Nestorian woman. In 1637, he sought to return to Europe together with the Holstein embassy which was led by Otto Brüggemann, his brother-in-law. Shah Safi however offered him a large amount of money to stay.

Before Stadler was able to make a decision, however, he shot dead a man who had broken into his house at night. Stadler had caught the same intruder once before and had ordered him never to set foot again in his house. According to Tavernier, the man was not a burglar, but the lover of Stadler's wife. Though Safavid law was on Stadler's side, intrigue sealed his fate; the Safavid court had him incarcerated and sentenced to death. Shah Safi was willing to pardon Stadler if he converted to Islam and had himself circumcised; however, as he refused, the court carried out the sentence. He was executed by the sword, on 16 October 1637, and was buried in Isfahan.

== Sources ==
- Floor, Willem (1992). "Clocks". In Yarshater, Ehsan (ed.). Encyclopædia Iranica. Vol. V/7: Class system V–Clothing X. London and New York: Routledge & Kegan Paul. pp. 713–718. ISBN 978-0-939214-75-4.
- Lassner, Martin (18 July 2011). "Johann Rudolf Stadler". Dictionnaire historique de la Suisse (DHS) (in French).
- Matthee, Rudolph (2013). "Iran's Relations with Europe in the Safavid Period: Diplomats, Missionaries, Merchants and Travel". In Langer, Axel (ed.). The Fascination of Persia – Persian European Dialogue in Seventeenth-Century Art and Contemporary Art of Teheran. Zürich: Scheidegger und Spies.
- Rota, Giorgio (2017). "Conversion to Islam (and sometimes a return to Christianity) in Safavid Persia in the sixteenth and seventeenth centuries". In Norton, Claire (ed.). Conversion and Islam in the Early Modern Mediterranean: The Lure of the Other. Routledge. ISBN 978-1317159797.
