= Dutch Admiralty =

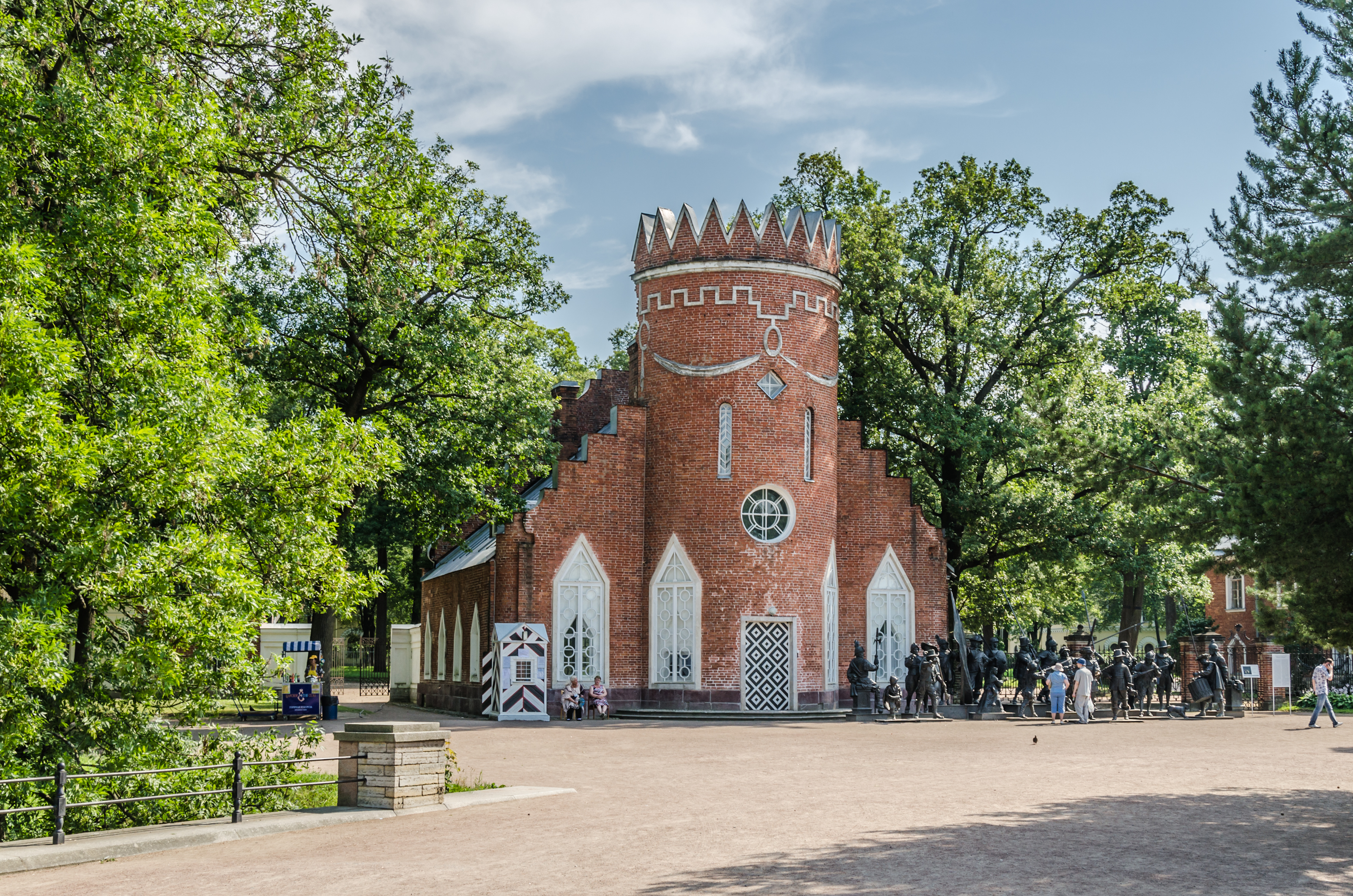
A Dutch Admiralty.

The Dutch Admiralty is the name applied to three follies designed in the traditional Dutch style and erected in summer 1773 on the bank of the Large Pond in the Catherine Park of Tsarskoe Selo (a former royal residence, now town of Pushkin, a suburb of Saint Petersburg, Russia). The pavilions are flanked by two towers in the Russian Gothic style. The central pavilion formerly housed the Globe of Gottorf, a collection of 166 English landscape engravings and an assortment of rare rowboats, which were destroyed during World War II.
