= Adam Olearius =

German scholar, mathematician and geographer (1599–1671)

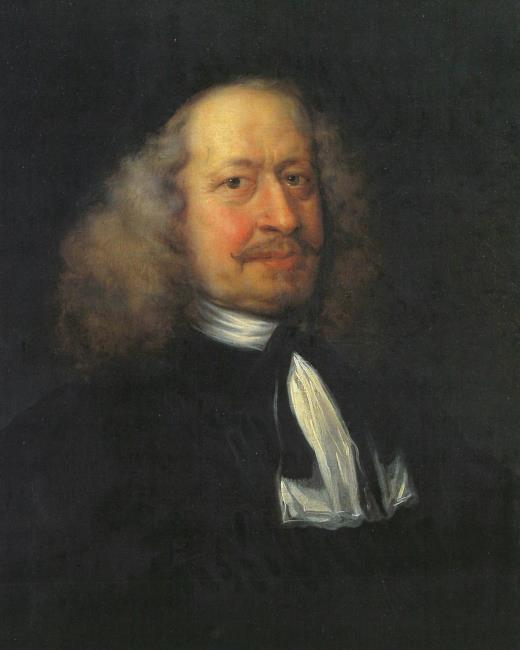
- Portrait by Jürgen Ovens, 1669
- Born: Adam Ölschläger; September 24, 1599 or August 16, 1603; Aschersleben, Prince-Bishopric of Halberstadt
- Died: February 22, 1671 (aged 71); Gottorf Castle, Duchy of Schleswig-Holstein-Gottorp
- Burial place: Trinity Church, Schleswig
- Education: Leipzig University
- Known for: Travels to Safavid Iran
- Relatives: Philipp Crusius (brother-in-law)

Adam Olearius (born Adam Ölschläger or Oehlschlaeger; 24 September 1599 or August 16, 1603 – 22 February 1671) was a German scholar, mathematician, geographer and librarian. He became secretary to the ambassador sent by Frederick III, Duke of Holstein-Gottorp, to the Shah of Safavid (Iran), and published two books about the events and observations during his travels.

== Early life ==
He was born at Aschersleben, near Magdeburg to tailor Adam Oehlschlegel (d. 1625) and his wife Maria Porst (d. 1620). His family name refers to the profession of oil millers (German: Ölschläger, lit. 'Oil-batter'). He grew up in modest circumstances. Nevertheless, thanks to his mother's and sisters' wool spinning money, in 1620 he managed to enrol in the Leipzig University to study theology. He also studied philosophy and mathematics. In 1627, Olearius was awarded the title of Magister of Philosophy and, five years later he was conrector and teaching at the Old St. Nicholas School and then at the Thomas School, he became an assistant at the Faculty of Philosophy in Leipzig. He was also supported as a fellow of the Minor Princes' Foundation (German: Kleineren Fürstenstiftung).

== Career ==
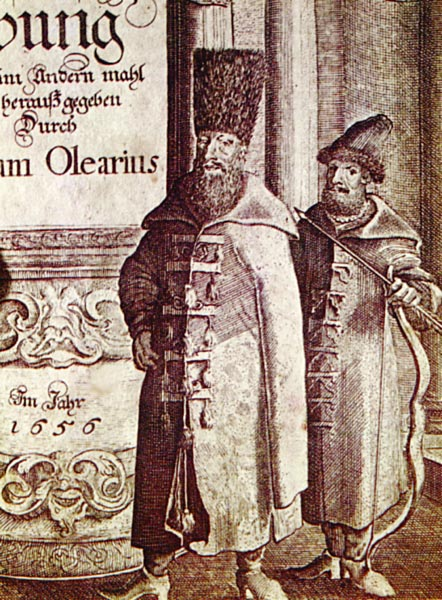
Russian boyar from one of Adam Olearius's books

He later became court official to Frederick III who was planning to establish economic ties between northern Germany and Russia. As a result, in 1633 he was appointed secretary to the ambassadors Philipp Crusius, jurisconsult, and Otto Bruggemann, a merchant from Hamburg, sent by the duke to Muscovy and Persia in the hope of making arrangements by which his newly founded city of Friedrichstadt should become the terminus of an overland silk-trade. This embassy started from Gottorp on 22 October 1633 and travelled by Hamburg, Lübeck, Riga, Dorpat (five months' stay), Reval, Narva, Ladoga, and Novgorod to Moscow (14 August 1634). According to some sources, here they concluded an advantageous treaty with Tsar Michael of Russia, and returned forthwith to Gottorp (14 December 1634 – 7 April 1635) to procure the ratification of this arrangement from the duke, before proceeding to Persia. However, according to Claus Priesner, the tsar's unrealistic expectations regarding customs revenues led to the failure of the mission.

Immediately upon returning to Gottorf on 6 April 1635, preparations began for a new expedition to the Safavid court. This aimed at a trade agreement with Persia and an alliance with the ruling Safavids against the Ottomans. Olearius on the other hand went on a mission to the Cardinal-Infante Ferdinand of Austria on behalf of the duke, but returned ill to Hamburg, and laid sick there for a long time.

Second Persian journey was again led by Brüggemann and Crusius, with Olearius once more as secretary. They were accompanied by, among others, the traveller Johan Albrecht de Mandelslo and the poet and physician Paul Fleming. The delegation left Altona on 22 October 1635, embarked at Travemünde, reached Moscow on 29 March 1636, and continued on 30 June via Balakhna near Nizhniy Novgorod, to Volga in a boat specially built for this purpose by the Lübeck skippers who had been brought along. On 10 October, they attempted to cross the Caspian Sea in a self-built vessel at Astrakhan but were shipwrecked in Niyazabad (near modern Xaçmaz and Derbent) on 14 November 1636. The land journey resumed on 22 December. They reached Shamakhi, the capital of Shirvan province, on 30 December and remained there until 27 March 1637. He witnessed Armenian Epiphany celebrations thanks to Safavid governor Arab Khan Shamlu.

During this time, Olearius conducted astronomical observations, met local scholars, and learned Persian. The delegation finally arrived in Isfahan via Ardabil, Soltaniyeh and Kasvin on 3 August 1637 and were received by the Safavid king, Shah Safi on 16 August. However, the mission soon failed largely due to the arrogant behaviour of its members, especially Brüggemann, who offended the Safavid court. After a festive reception, they experienced just a few days later a bloody battle between their retinue and the Uzbek escort of an embassy from the Mughal Empire, in which 5 of the Holstein party were killed and 10 wounded.

They departed on 21 December 1637 without having achieved any diplomatic result. Mandelslo separated from the group to continue on to India. The rest of the delegation returned via the Elburz Mountains, reaching the Caspian Sea again on 14 June 1638. From there, they retraced their route. Due to a serious falling out with Brüggemann, Olearius left the group in Reval and travelled ahead. Brüggemann returned with the rest of the delegation to Gottorf on 1 August 1639. He was held solely responsible for the mission's failure and financial losses despite Crusius apparently having been the true leader and was publicly executed for incompetence on 5 May 1640.

Once back at Gottorp, Olearius became librarian to the duke, who also made him keeper of his cabinet of curiosities 10 years later in 1649, and induced the tsar to excuse his (promised) return to Moscow. Under his care the Gottorp library and cabinet were greatly enriched in manuscripts, books, and oriental and other works of art: in 1651 he purchased, for this purpose, the collection of the Dutch scholar and physician, Bernardus Paludanus (born Berent ten Broecke). Same year Olearius was inducted into the Fruitbearing Society by Wilhelm IV of Saxe-Weimar. He was given the society name Der Vielbemühete ("The Much-Engaged") and the motto In der Fremde ("In Foreign Lands"). His emblem was a Muscovite orange. As court mathematician, Olearius gained broader fame in 1654 when he constructed the Globe of Gottorf, with a diameter of 3.01 metres. The globe was given to Peter the Great of Russia in 1713 by Duke Frederick's grandson, Christian Augustus.

== Family ==
After Crusius married Maria Müller in 1638, the daughter of merchant Johannes Müller in Reval where the expedition had stayed, Olearius married her sister Catharina (d. 1676) a year later. They had three daughters and a son. In 1644, the Duke granted him land and timber to build a house in Friedrichsberg near Gottorf Castle. However, on October 30, 1658, during Northern War of 1655–1660, his estate was plundered by imperial troops.

He died at Gottorp on 22 February 1671. He was buried in Trinity Church designed by himself. A dispute arose over Olearius's estate, in which court councilor and chancellery secretary, and his son-in-law Burchard Niederstätten played a less than sympathetic role. Philipp Christian Olearius, who was only 13 years old at his father's death, later complained that the executor, Niederstätten, had arbitrarily sold most of his father's extensive library to the bookbinder Hans Dose in Hamburg for 500-600 thalers, although it was worth at least 2,000 thalers. Philipp Christian later enrolled at the University of Kiel in 1682, earned a doctorate in medicine in Erfurt in 1689.

== Books ==
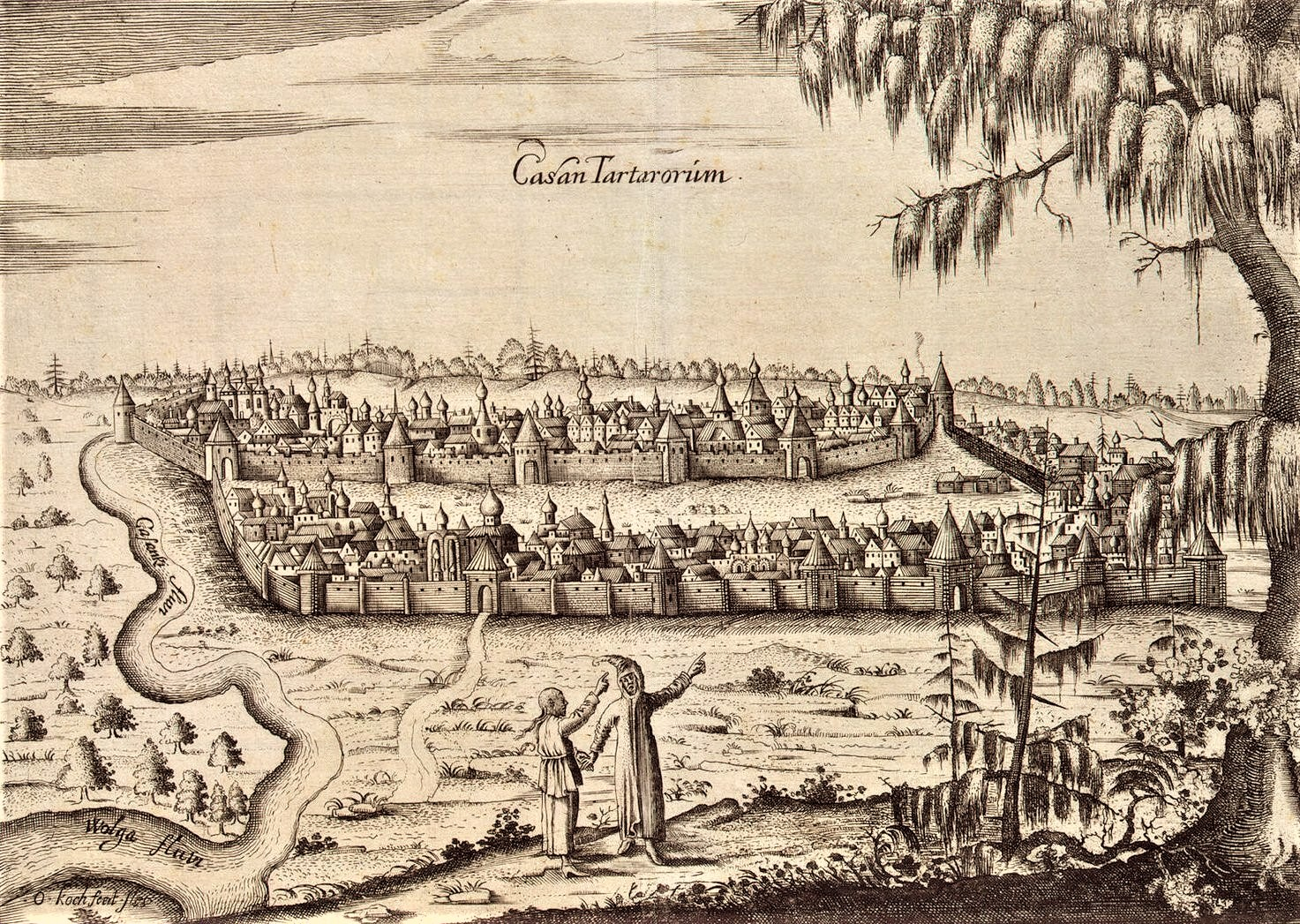
Olearius' image of Kazan

Frontispiece from Olearius' catalogue of the Holstein-Gottorp cabinet of curiosities (1674 edition).

It is by his admirable narrative of the Russian and the Persian legation (Beschreibung der muscowitischen und persischen Reise, Schleswig, 1647, and afterwards in several enlarged editions, 1656, etc.) that Olearius is best known, though he also published a history of Holstein (Kurtzer Begriff einer holsteinischen Chronic, Schleswig, 1663), a famous catalogue of the Holstein-Gottorp cabinet (1666), and a translation of the Gulistan (Persianisches Rosenthal, Schleswig, 1654), to which was written by Saadi Shirazi appended a translation of the fables of Luqman. A French version of the Beschreibung was published by Abraham de Wicquefort (Voyages en Moscovie, Tartarie et Perse, par Adam Olearius, Paris, 1656), an English version was made by John Davies of Kidwelly (Travels of the Ambassadors sent by Frederic, Duke of Holstein, to the Great Duke of Muscovy and the King of Persia, London, 1662; and 1669), and a Dutch translation by Dieterius van Wageningen (Beschrijvingh van de nieuwe Parciaensche ofte Orientaelsche Reyse, Utrecht, 1651); an Italian translation of the Russian sections also appeared (Viaggi di Moscovia, Viterbo and Rome, 1658). Paul Fleming the poet and J. A. de Mandelslo, whose travels to the East Indies are usually published with those of Olearius, accompanied the embassy. Olearius' unpublished works include a Lexicon Persicum and several other Persian studies.

By his lively and well-informed writing he introduced Germany (and the rest of Europe) to Persian literature and culture. To achieve this, he not only used the written form, but also incorporated references to Persian miniature painting and other elements into his book art. Montesquieu depended on him for local colour in writing his satiric Lettres Persanes (Persian Letters, 1721), though he used the French translation, Relation de voyage de Moscovie, Tartarie et de Perse. Among his many translations of Persian literature into German are Saadi's Golistan: Persianischer Rosenthal. In welchem viel lustige Historien ... von ... Schich Saadi in Persianischer Sprache beschrieben, printed in Schleswig by Holwein in 1654.

Olearius also contributed to church reform by translating the Low German agenda into High German. This version, published in 1665, remained in use in Schleswig-Holstein churches until the rationalist agenda of Jacob Georg Christian Adler was introduced—and in some places even longer. It was reprinted in 1850.

In 1669, Olearius also published the travel accounts of Jürgen Andersen and Volquard Iversen under the title Oriental Travel Descriptions (German: Orientalische[n]=Reisebeschreibungen), as well as Heinrich von Uchteritz's account of Barbados in 1666.

=== Selected works ===
- Auserlesene Gedichte (Selected Poems), ed. Wilhelm Müller, Leipzig 1822
- Lustige Historie woher das Tabacktrincken kompt (Funny story where tobacco drinking comes from). Schleswig, 1643.
- Vermehrte Newe Beschreibung Der Muscowitischen und Persischen Reyse So durch gelegenheit einer Holsteinischen Gesandtschaft an den Russischen Zaar und König in Persien geschehen (Revised New Description of the Muscovite and Persian Journey, as done on the occasion of a Holstein Embassy to the Russian Tsar and King in Persia) Schleswig 1656 (Repr. Tübingen: Niemeyer 1971) (Digitized version)
- Moskowitische und persische Reise: die holsteinische Gesandtschaft 1633–1639 (Muscovite and Persian journey: the Holstein embassy 1633–1639) Schleswig 1656, Repr. Stuttgart: Thienemann, 1986, ISBN 3-522-60650-7
- Kurtze Erinnerung und Bericht von der grossen und erschrecklichen Sonnen-Finsterniß so dieses 1630. Jahrs den letzten Maij … sich sehen lassen, (A short recollection and report of the great and terrible solar eclipse that took place last May of this 1630th year...) Leipzig 1630 (Digitized version)
- Offt begehrte Beschreibung Der Newen Orientalischen Reise / So durch Gelegenheit einer Holsteinischen Legation an den König in Persien geschehen: Worinnen Derer Orter und Länder / durch welche die Reise gangen / als fürnemblich Rußland / Tartarien und Persien / sampt ihrer Einwohner Natur / Leben und Wesen fleissig beschrieben / und mit vielen Kupfferstücken / so nach dem Leben gestellet / gezieret / Durch M. Adamum Olearium, Ascanium Saxonem, Fürstl: Schleßwig-Holsteinischen Hoff-mathemat. Item Ein Schreiben des WolEdeln [et]c. Johann Albrecht Von Mandelslo: worinnen dessen OstIndianische Reise über den Oceanum enthalten; Zusampt eines kurtzen Berichts von jetzigem Zustand des eussersten Orientalischen KönigReiches Tzina, Schleswig 1647 (Digitized version)
- Persianischer Rosenthal (Gulistan) Hamburg 1654 (Digitized version)
- Ausführliche Beschreibung der kundbaren Reyse Nach Muscow und Persien. So durch gelegenheit einer Holsteinischen Gesandschafft von Gottorff auß an Michael Fedorowitz den grossen Zaar in Muscow / und Schach Sefi König in Persien geschehen … (Detailed description of the known journey to Moscow and Persia. As sent by a Holstein embassy from Gottorff to Michael Fyodorovich, the Great Tsar in Muscow, and Shah Safi, King in Persia.), Schleswig 1663 (Digitized version)
- Gottorfische Kunst-Cammer, Schleswig 1666 (Digitized version: Volume 1, Volume 2)

== See also ==
- Globe of Gottorf
