= Krusenstern (crater) =

Crater on the Moon

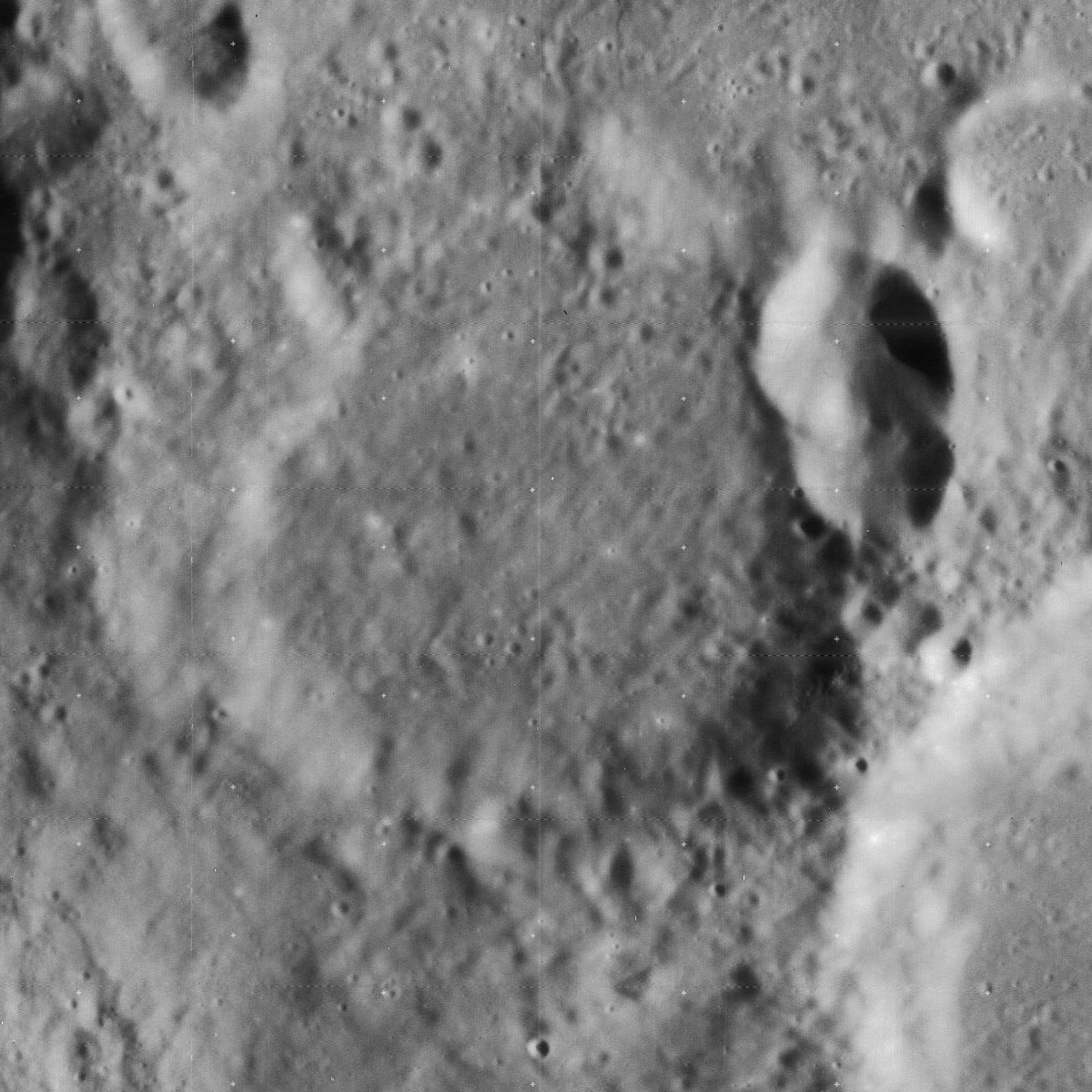
- Lunar Orbiter 4 image
- Coordinates: 26.2°S 5.9°E
- Diameter: 47 km
- Depth: 1.6 km
- Colongitude: 355° at sunrise
- Formation: Pre-Nectarian
- Eponym: Adam Johann von Krusenstern

Krusenstern is a lunar impact crater that lies amidst the battered terrain in the southern part of the Moon's near side. Nearly attached to the east-southeast rim is the crater Apianus. Less than one crater diameter to the southwest is the prominent Werner. Krusenstern is intruding into a large circular plain to the north designated Playfair G. Playfair itself lies to the northeast.

Krusenstern is 47 kilometers in diameter, and its walls reach a height of 1,600 meters. Its outer rim has been heavily worn by impact erosion, leaving an irregular ring of rising ridges and an inner wall incised by impacts. A joined pair of craters, including Krusenstern A, lie along the eastern rim. The interior floor of Krusenstern is a nearly featureless plain, marked only by a few tiny craterlets. The crater is from the Pre-Nectarian period, 4.55 to 3.92 billion years ago.

It is named after Adam Johann von Krusenstern, an early 19th-century Baltic German explorer in Russian service.

== Satellite craters ==
By convention these features are identified on lunar maps by placing the letter on the side of the crater midpoint that is closest to Krusenstern.

Krusenstern	Latitude	Longitude	Diameter
A	26.9° S	5.9° E	5 km
