= Otto Brüggemann (merchant) =

German merchant from Hamburg; ambassador to Safavid Iran in the 1630s

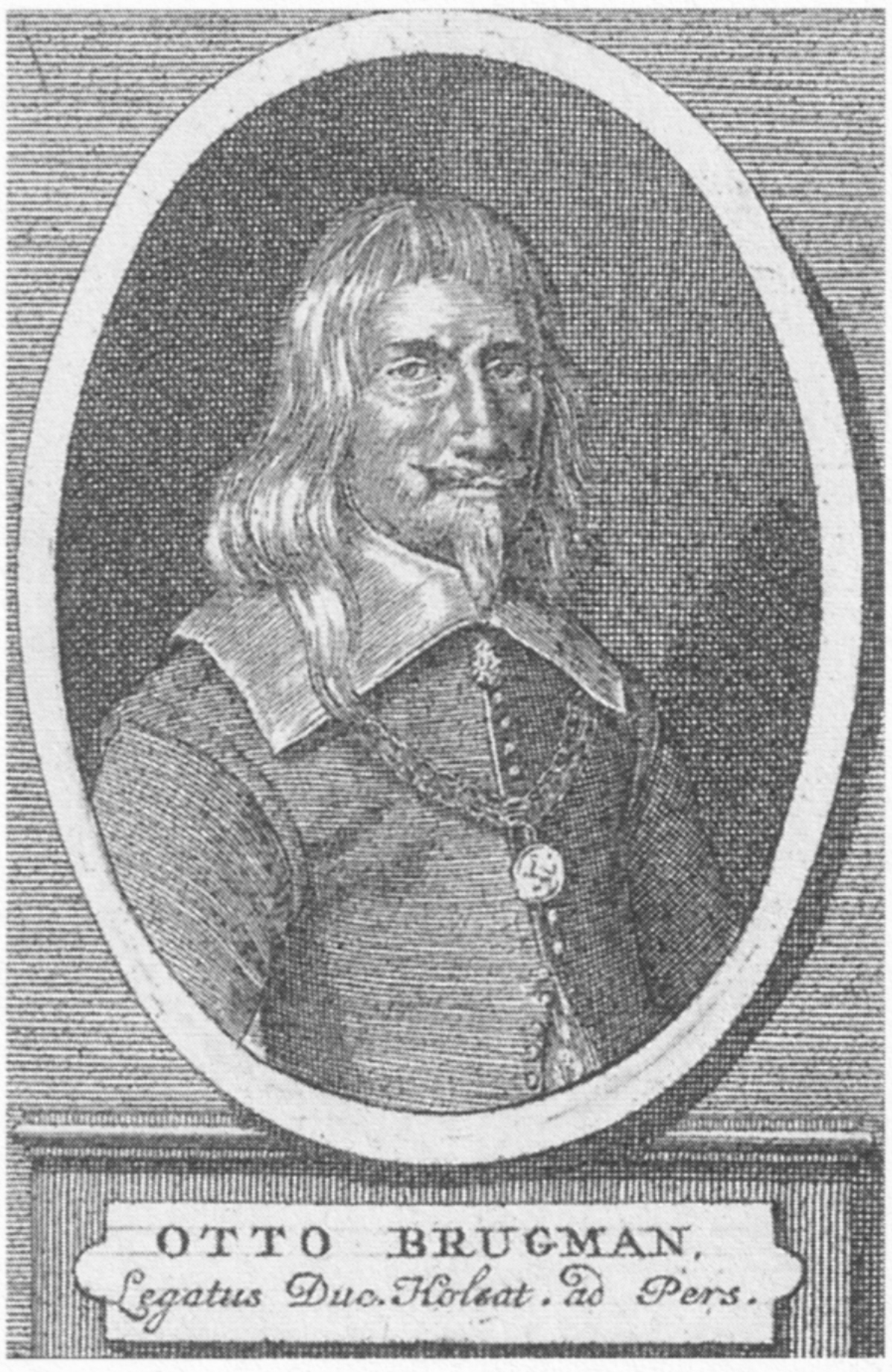
- Born: February 14, 1600; Hamburg
- Died: May 5, 1640 (aged 40); Schleswig, Schleswig-Holstein
- Criminal charges: Exceeding authority, embezzlement, betraying
- Criminal penalty: Execution
- Relatives: Johann Rudolf Stadler (brother-in-law)

Otto Brüggemann (February 14, 1600 – May 5, 1640) was a German merchant from Hamburg who served as ambassador for Frederick III, Duke of Holstein-Gottorp during a trade mission to Safavid Iran in the 1630s.

== Biography ==
Otto Brüggemann was the son of a Hamburg merchant and sea captain also named Otto Brüggemann and his wife Catharina, whose father was a merchant and presumably named Steffen von Essen. His relatives included Johann Rudolf Stadler, a Swiss-born clockmaker who was Brüggemann's brother-in-law and the Reval councilman Johann Müller, who was the father-in-law of Adam Olearius and Philipp Crusius. According to Adam Olearius, he spent an extended period on the Iberian Peninsula as a young man and lived in Porto. Since he was well acquainted with the organization and workflows of the Dutch East India Company, it can be assumed that he also traveled to the Netherlands.

In 1629, Brüggemann acquired Hamburg citizenship and was registered as civis filius (citizen's son) and mercator (merchant). He traded between the Baltic Sea and Spain. Around 1630, he proposed to Duke Frederick III to create a new trading company. He also wanted to establish a new trade route that would lead via the Caspian Sea, the Volga, and Dvina to Archangelsk. From there, the route would continue around Scandinavia to Friedrichstadt. Brüggemann planned to take market share from Dutch traders in the trade of silk from Persia and products from India.

In 1632, Brüggemann traveled to Russia and conducted initial negotiations in Moscow regarding passage through the country. Since the Swedes were also interested in the trade route, Brüggemann altered its course: products would now be transported from the Volga not to the White Sea, but through Swedish provinces in the Baltic region. After that, the goods would cross the Baltic Sea and land in Kiel.

In early 1633, Brüggemann traveled with Crusius to Halle. There, they negotiated with Axel Oxenstierna for Swedish participation in the trading company and the route through the Baltic region. With the agreement made there, they went to Stockholm in June of the same year. Here they asked the Council of the Realm to approve the agreement. In November 1633, Brüggemann and Crusius led a delegation to Moscow, where they successfully negotiated a trade agreement with the Tsar.

In October 1635, Brüggemann and Crusius set out with numerous companions on a grand journey that lasted almost four years. They first visited Moscow and traveled via the Volga and the Caspian Sea to Isfahan. Here they unsuccessfully negotiated with Shah Safi. To prevent the complete failure of his efforts, Brüggemann sought more profitable options. He suggested that the Russians should annex Persian provinces where silk was produced. Furthermore, according to Olearius, a union with Poland should be sought, and the staple place should no longer be in Gottorf territory but in Danzig.

== Trial and execution ==
Upon returning to Schleswig in 1639, Brüggemann was arrested and put on trial. He faced multiple charges including exceeding his authority, embezzlement, betraying colleagues, and various other crimes. Olearius himself brought a successful civil suit against him. After being found guilty, he was sentenced to death. Duke Frederick commuted the original sentence of hanging to beheading, which was considered a more honorable form of execution for a person of his status. Brüggemann was executed by sword on May 5, 1640. According to Olearius, who visited him in prison the night before his execution, Brüggemann accepted responsibility for his actions, thanked the duke for the more merciful sentence, and went to his death with prayers to God. His grave reportedly bore the epitaph: "Holstein gave me great happiness: my own actions are responsible for my death."

=== Depiction by Adam Olearius ===
In his travel account Vermehrte neue Beschreibung, Adam Olearius portrayed Otto Bruggemann in an increasingly negative light. Initially describing a cordial acquaintance during preparations for the Holstein-Persian embassy, Olearius’s narrative gradually shifted to depict Bruggemann as petty, violent, and corrupt. According to Olearius, Bruggemann frequently insulted and humiliated his subordinates, mishandled diplomatic ceremonies—most notably in Derbent and Shamakhi—and compromised the mission's safety through repeated breaches of protocol. Olearius further accused Bruggemann of pursuing unauthorised private trade deals in Russia, Sweden, and Persia, embezzling embassy funds, and misleading the Persian shah regarding a fictitious anti-Ottoman alliance. Bruggemann’s behaviour culminated in violence when he ordered the murder of a Qizilbash after a minor dispute. This incident severely damaged relations with Safavids and jeopardised the embassy’s safe passage.

=== Reassessment of the Brüggemann Case ===
A 1639 Latin congratulatory poem Gratulatio Et Votiva Acclamatio, authored by a Johann Crusius (who could be related to Philipp Crusius) praises Otto Brüggemann’s diplomatic mission to Russia and Persia, portraying him as a loyal and successful envoy of Frederick III. The poem emphasises Brüggemann’s personal achievements in securing relations with Tsar Michael Romanov and Shah Safi, and presents his return as a triumph blessed by divine favour, with no indication of later accusations or controversy.

Otto Brüggemann defended himself against the accusations primarily through a written confession recorded shortly before his execution, known as the Copia Instrumenti publici, published in 1640. In this document, Brüggemann asserted his innocence, stating that he had always acted loyally towards Duke Frederick III and the Gottorf state, and that his actions had been misrepresented by enemies such as Philipp Crusius, Adam Olearius, and Marcellus. Brüggemann claimed that under torture he had been forced to falsely admit to misconduct, including alleged conspiracies and financial misdeeds. He detailed that his accounts showed no theft or fraud, and he maintained that any financial discrepancies were either minor or the result of misunderstandings. Brüggemann also defended the innocence of others implicated by the proceedings, such as Colonel Christian Hübner and Andreas Schröder. In his final testimony, he described himself as a victim of intrigue and political convenience rather than genuine criminal behaviour, entrusting his case ultimately to divine judgment.

Modern research, particularly by Manfred Guido Schmitz, has critically re-evaluated Adam Olearius’ account of Otto Brüggemann’s role during the Gottorf embassy to Russia and Persia. Schmitz argues that Olearius’ portrayal of Brüggemann as corrupt and violent is not consistently supported by verifiable facts. Instead, the accusations appear heavily shaped by personal animosity and political expediency. According to Schmitz, Olearius had strong motives to depict Brüggemann negatively. During the embassy, Olearius became the brother-in-law of Philipp Crusius, the lead diplomat. Protecting Crusius from any possible association with alleged misconduct would have served Olearius’ interests at the Gottorf court. Furthermore, Brüggemann, a Hamburg merchant, had likely invested personal funds into the mission and might later have made financial claims that the Duke, facing fiscal difficulties after the 1634 floods, could not or did not wish to honour.

Schmitz highlights procedural irregularities in Brüggemann’s prosecution. Olearius delayed initiating legal proceedings until after the departure of Russian and Persian envoys, who might have testified in Brüggemann’s favour. Despite serious allegations, Brüggemann was not arrested immediately upon return, and no immediate disciplinary action was taken, suggesting that the case may have been politically motivated. In this interpretation, Brüggemann’s execution in 1640 served to eliminate a financially and politically inconvenient figure, allowing Duke Frederick III to distance himself from obligations arising from preliminary trade agreements negotiated by the embassy. Olearius’ subsequent published account thus appears, at least in part, as an effort to retroactively justify the court’s actions. Schmitz ultimately presents Brüggemann not as the villain Olearius described, but as a political scapegoat sacrificed for the convenience of Gottorf’s ruling interests.
