= Adam Johann von Krusenstern =

Russian admiral and explorer (1770–1846)

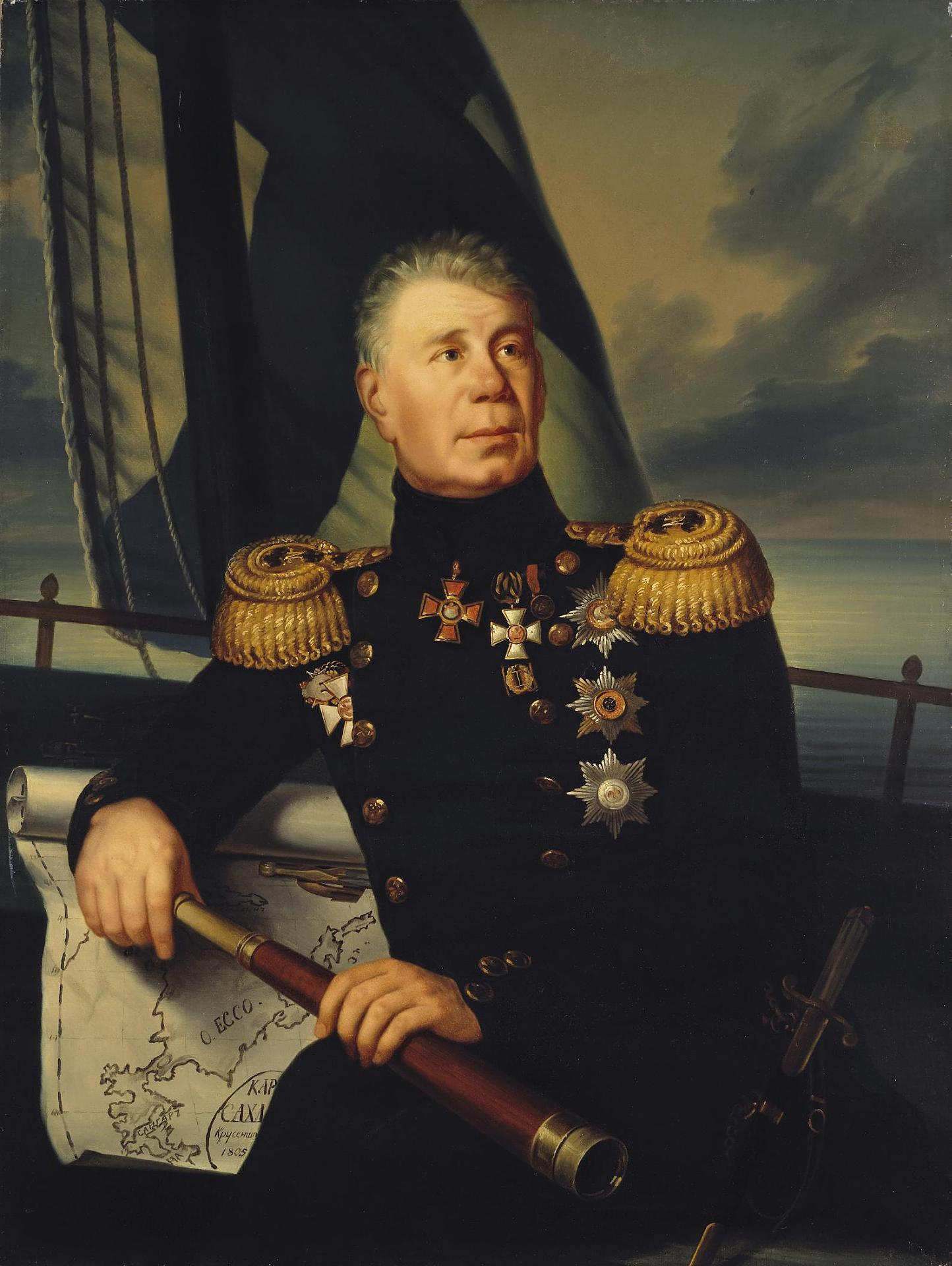
- Portrait, after 1838
- Born: 10 October 1770; Haggud, Reval Governorate, Russian Empire
- Died: 12 August 1846 (aged 75); Gilsenhof, Governorate of Estonia, Russian Empire
- Other name: Ivan Fedorovich Krusenstern
- Military career
- Allegiance: Russia
- Branch: Imperial Russian Navy
- Rank: Admiral
- Commands: Nadezhda
- Awards: Order of St. George 4th class (1802); Order of St. Alexander Nevsky (1837); Pour le Mérite (civil class)

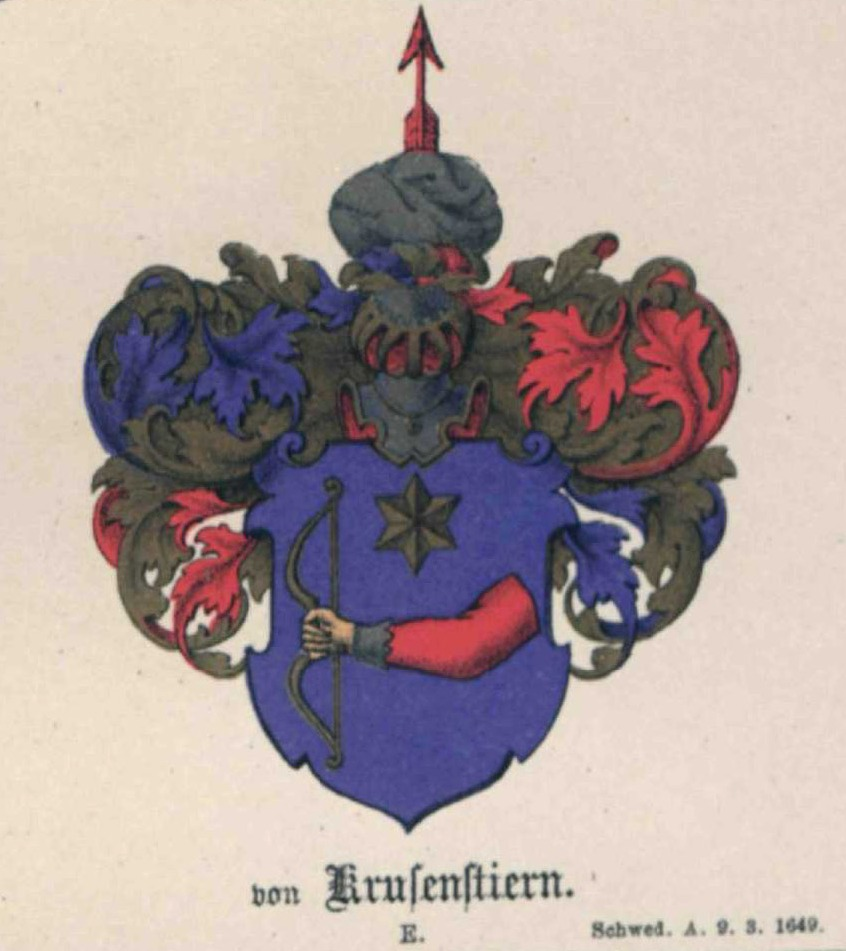
Krusenstern family coat of arms

Adam Johann von Krusenstern (Russian: Ива́н Фёдорович Крузенште́рн, romanized: Ivan Fyodorovich Kruzenshtern; 10 October 1770 – 12 August 1846) was a Russian admiral and explorer of Swedish and Baltic German descent, who led the first Russian circumnavigation of the Earth in 1803–1806.

== Career ==
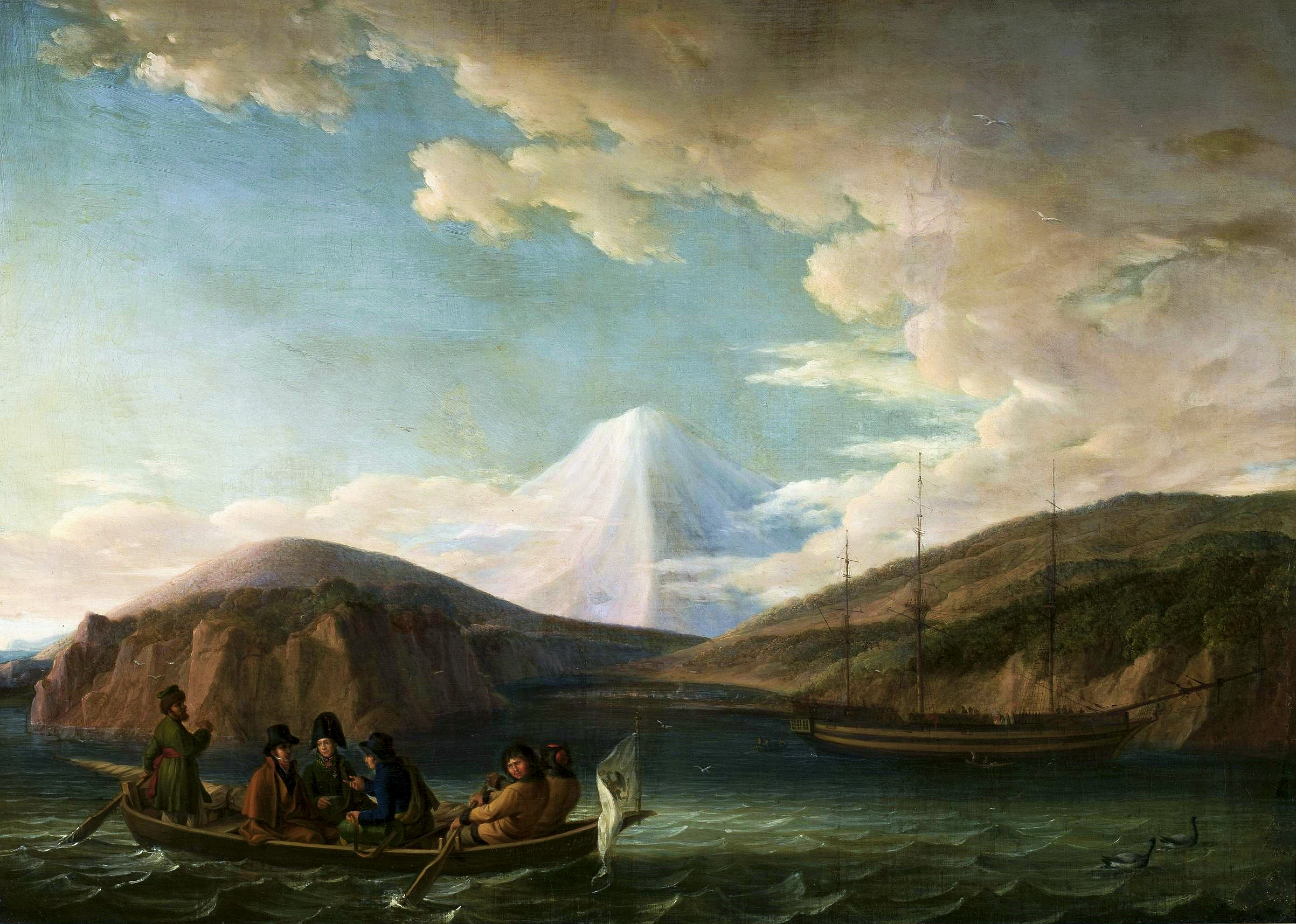
Adam Johann von Krusenstern in Avacha Bay by Friedrich Georg Weitsch, c. 1806. The Koryaksky volcano is in the background, on the Kamchatka Peninsula in far-east Russia. National Museum in Warsaw

Krusenstern was born in Haggud, Harrien County, Reval Governorate, Russian Empire (now Hagudi, Estonia), to a Baltic German noble family. His patrilineal ancestors descended from the Swedish noble family von Krusenstierna, and had remained in Estonia after Sweden ceded the country to the Russian Empire in 1721. In 1787, Krusenstern joined the Russian Imperial Navy, and served in the war against Sweden. Subsequently, he served in the British Royal Navy between 1793 and 1799, visiting America, India and China.

After publishing a paper pointing out the advantages of direct communication by sea between Russia and China by passing Cape Horn at the southern tip of South America and the Cape of Good Hope at the tip of South Africa, he was appointed by Tsar Alexander I to make a voyage to the Far East coast of Asia to endeavour to carry out the project. Under the patronage of Alexander, Count Nikolay Petrovich Rumyantsev and the Russian-American Company, Krusenstern led the first Russian circumnavigation of the world. The chief object of this undertaking was the development of the fur trade with Russian America (Alaska). The Russian provinces along the Pacific Ocean suffered from being badly connected to Moscow. The aim was to establish a commercial network that would connect Russia's Pacific provinces with Spanish California, Spanish Manila, and the Chinese port of Guangzhou. Therefore Krusenstern and Otto von Kotzebue were commissioned to command the ship Nadezhda in 1803 and the ship Rurik in 1815. The two ships traveled from the Baltic through the North Sea and the Atlantic Ocean to the Pacific Ocean.

Upon his return, Krusenstern wrote a detailed report, "Reise um die Welt in den Jahren 1803, 1804, 1805 und 1806 auf Befehl Seiner Kaiserlichen Majestät Alexanders des Ersten auf den Schiffen Nadeschda und Newa" ("Journey around the World in the Years 1803, 1804, 1805, and 1806 at the Command of his Imperial Majesty Alexander I in the Ships Nadezhda and Neva") published in Saint Petersburg in 1810. It was published in 1811–1812 in Berlin. This was followed by an English translation, published in London in 1813 and subsequently by French, Dutch, Danish, Swedish, and Italian translations. His scientific work, which includes an atlas of the Pacific, was published in 1827 in Saint Petersburg.

The geographical discoveries of Krusenstern made his voyage important for the progress of geographical science. His work won him an honorary membership in the Russian Academy of Sciences. He was elected a foreign member of the Royal Swedish Academy of Sciences 1816 and to the American Philosophical Society in 1824.

As director of the Russian naval school Krusenstern did much useful work. He was also a member of the scientific committee of the marine department, and his contrivance for counteracting the influence of the iron in vessels on the compass was adopted in the navy. Krusenstern became an admiral of Russian Navy in 1841 and he was awarded the Pour le Mérite (civil class) in 1842. He died in 1846 in Kiltsi manor, an Estonian manor he had purchased in 1816, and was buried in Tallinn Cathedral.

== Legacy and family ==
A son was born to Krusenstern in 1809: Paul Theodor, who lived until 1881. He explored the Arctic Ocean and Kara Sea, most notably in 1862, when he was shipwrecked.

The Russian training tall ship Kruzenshtern is named after him. To commemorate the 200th anniversary of Krusenstern's circumnavigation, the ship retraced his route around the globe in 2005–2006.

Another ship named after him is the 1964-built Russian icebreaker Ivan Kruzenstern that was renamed after him in 1966. An Aeroflot Airbus A320 is named after him.

Mount Kruzenshtern, the highest mountain in Novaya Zemlya, as well as crater Krusenstern on the Moon are named after him. There is Krusenstern Island in the Bering Strait, as well as a small group of islands in the Kara Sea, southwest of the Nordenskiöld Archipelago, called Krusenstern Islands. Cape Krusenstern in Northwest Alaska is the site of Cape Krusenstern National Monument (1978), one of the most important archaeological sites in the state.

In Russia (as well as in other Russophone places), a fictional steamship Admiral Ivan Fyodorovich Kruzenshtern from the popular Prostokvashino animated film series is well-known, often as part of a catchphrase "Admiral I. F. Kruzenshtern, a man and a steamship", "pirated" from the title of a requiem poem by Vladimir Mayakovsky, To Comrade Nette, a Steamship and a Man. As a third-level linguistic derivation, there is a Russophone Israel klezmer-rock band, Kruzenshtern & Parohod ("Krusenstern and Steamship").

Another legacy is that the Cook Islands in the South Pacific bear that name thanks to von Krusenstern. Previously known as the Hervey (or Harvey) Islands (or Group), he changed their name in 1835 to honour Captain Cook. More accurately, he changed the name of those which comprised the Southern Group and it was subsequently applied to all 15 islands when the New Zealand Parliament passed "The Cook Islands and other Islands Government Act" in 1901. He recorded the new name in his Atlas de l'Océan Pacifique published at St. Petersburg between 1824 and 1835.

== Bibliography ==
- Reise um die Welt in den Jahren 1803, 1804, 1805 und 1806 auf Befehl Seiner Kaiserl (1811)
  - Voyage Round the World in the Years 1803, 1804, 1805 & 1806 translated by Richard Belgrave Hoppner (1813)
  - A Voyage Round the World, in the Years 1803, 4, 5, & 6 translated by Yuri Lisyansky (1814)

== See also ==
- Empire of Japan–Russian Empire relations
- European and American voyages of scientific exploration
- List of Baltic German explorers

== Sources ==
- "Крузенштерн, Иоганн-Антон" . Brockhaus and Efron Encyclopedic Dictionary (in Russian). 1906.
- "Крузенштерн, Иван Фёдорович". Great Russian Encyclopedia – Electronic version. 2023.
