= Russian ship Rurik =

At least four ships of the Imperial Russian Navy have been named Rurik after Rurik, the semi-legendary founder of ancient Russia.

- Russian brig Rurik (1816) - a scientific expeditionary vessel that voyaged to Chile, California, the Aleutians, Hawaiʻi, the Marshall Islands, the Marianas and the Philippines
- Russian frigate Rurik (1851) - a frigate that served in the Crimean War
- Russian cruiser Rurik (1892) - an armoured cruiser sunk at the Battle off Ulsan
- Russian cruiser Rurik (1906) - a Russian armoured cruiser built by Vickers
