= Hagudi =

Borough in Estonia

- Small borough
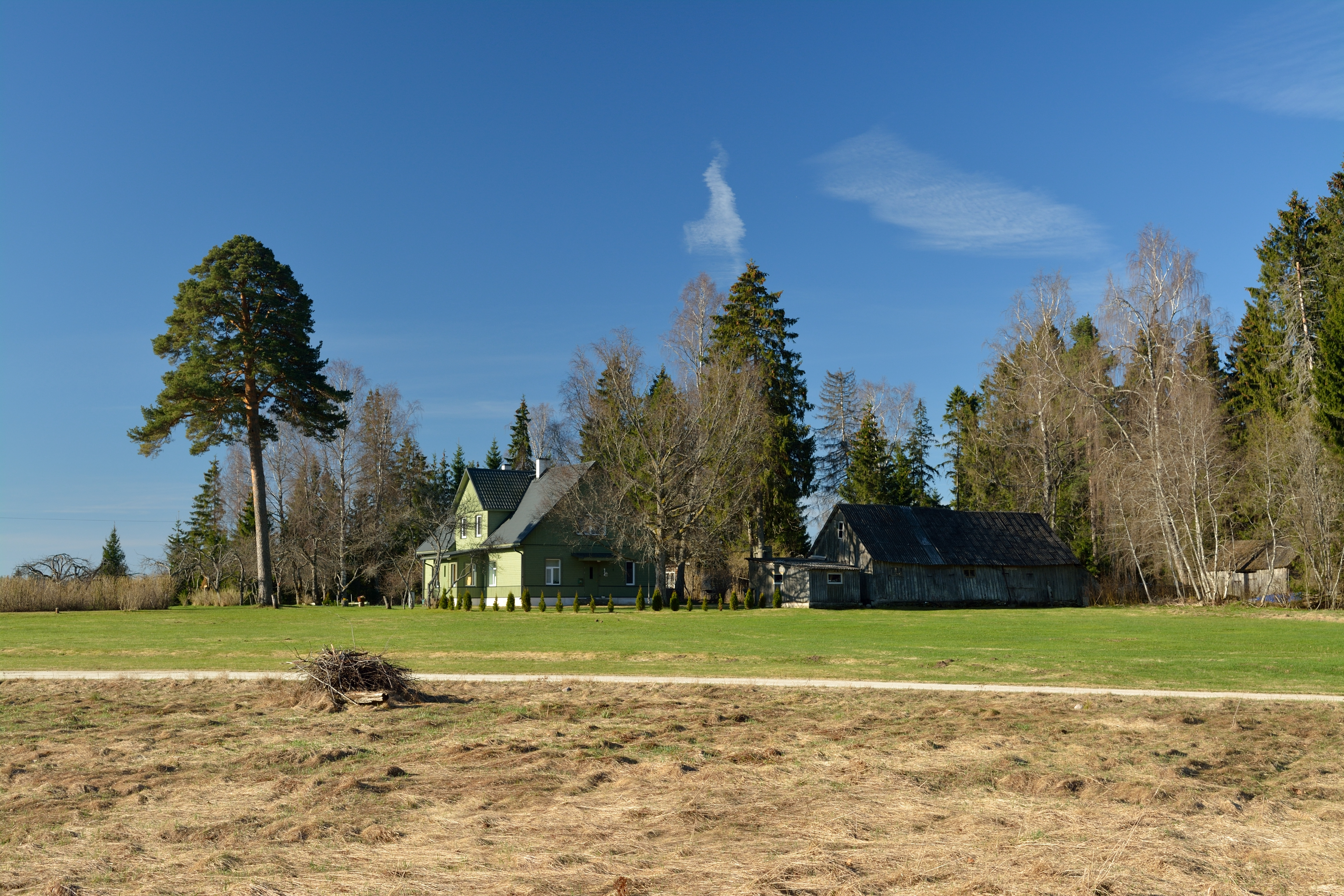

- Location in Estonia
- Coordinates: 59°03′54″N 24°48′33″E
- Country: Estonia
- County: Rapla County
- Municipality: Rapla Parish

Population (2011 Census)
  - Total: 311

Hagudi (German: Haggud) is a small borough (Estonian: alevik) in Rapla Parish, Rapla County, Estonia. As of the 2011 census, the settlement's population was 311.

It has a railway station on the Tallinn - Viljandi railway line operated by Elron (rail transit).

Baltic German admiral and explorer Adam Johann von Krusenstern (1770–1846), was born in Hagudi manor.
