= List of governors of the Danish Gold Coast =

Chronological list of colonial governors that ruled the Danish colony on the Gold Coast

The Danish Gold Coast was established on the eastern Gold Coast (present-day Ghana):

- Fort Fredensborg (Ningo)
- Fort Christiansborg
- Fort Augustaborg (Tshi)
- Fort Prinsensten (Keta)
- Fort Kongensten (Ada).

(Dates in italics indicate de facto continuation of office)

Tenure	Incumbent	Notes
Danish Suzerainty
1657–8	Danish Gold Coast Settlements established on the eastern Gold Coast	
1658	Heinrich Carloff, Opperhoved	
1659	Samuel Schmidt, Opperhoved	
1659 to 1662	Jost Cramer, Opperhoved	
1662 to 1668	Henning Albrecht, Opperhoved	
1668 to 1674	Bartholomaus von Gronstein, Governor—1st to be designated as governor	
1674 to 1677	Conrad Crull, Governor	
1677 to 1681	Peter With, Opperhoved	
1681	Magnus Prang, Governor	
to 1698	Erik Tylleman, Opperhoved	
10 June 1698 to 23 December 1698	Erik Oehlsen, Opperhoved	
23 December 1698 to 31 August 1703	John Trawne, Opperhoved	
11 September 1703 to 23 April 1704	Hartvig Meyer, Opperhoved	
23 April 1704 to 5 May 1705	Peter Sverdrup, acting Opperhoved	
5 May 1705 to 25 May 1705	Peter Petersen, acting Opperhoved	
25 May 1705 to 17 August 1711	Erik Olsen Lygaard, Opperhoved	2nd Term
17 August 1711 to 26 November 1717	Bfantz Boye, Opperhoved	
26 November 1717 to 6 August 1720	Knud Røst, Opperhoved	
6 August 1720 to 24 January 1722	Peter Østrup, Opperhoved	
25 January 1722 to 22 January 1723	Niels Jensen Østrup, Opperhoved	
22 January 1723 to 27 April 1724	Christian Andreas Syndermann, Opperhoved	
27 April 1724 to 1 March 1727	Hendrik von Suhm, Opperhoved	
4 March 1727 to 18 September 1727	Fred Pahl, Opperhoved	
18 September 1727 to 24 December 1728	Andreas Willumsen, Opperhoved	
24 December 1728 to 12 August 1735	Anders Pedersen Waerøe, Opperhoved	
12 August 1735 to 14 June 1736	Severin Schilderup, Opperhoved	
14 June 1736 to 20 June 1740	Enevold Nielson Boris, Opperhoved	
20 June 1740 to 26 May 1743	Peter Nikolaj Jørgensen, Opperhoved	
26 May 1743 to 3 February 1744	Christian Glob Dorph, Opperhoved	
3 February 1744 to 11 March 1745	Jørgen Billsen, Opperhoved	
11 March 1745 to 23 March 1745	Thomas Brock, Opperhoved	
23 March 1745 to 23 April 1745	Johan Wilder, Opperhoved	
23 April 1745 to 21 June 1746	August Frederik Hackenburg, Opperhoved	
21 June 1746 to 1750	Joost Platfusz, Opperhoved	
Danish crown colony
1750 to 6 March 1751	Joost Platfusz, Opperhoved	
6 March 1751 to 8 March 1751	Magnus Christopher Lützow, Opperhoved	
8 March 1751 to 21 July 1752	Magnus Hacksen, acting Opperhoved	
21 July 1752 to 11 March 1757	Carl Engman, Opperhoved	
11 March 1757 to 14 February 1762	Christian Jessen, Opperhoved	
14 February 1762 to 20 October 1766	Carl Gottleb Resch, Opperhoved	
20 October 1766 to 11 January 1768	Christian Tychsen, Governor	
11 January 1768 to 2 July 1769	Frantz Joachim Kuhberg, Governor	
2 July 1769 to 11 June 1770	Joachim Christian Otto, acting Governor	
11 June 1770 to 15 June 1772	Johan Daniel Frøhlich, acting Governor	
15 June 1772 to 24 June 1777	Niels Urban Aarestrup, acting Governor	
24 June 1777 to 2 December 1780	Johan Conrad von Hemsen, Governor	
2 December 1780 to 21 April 1788	Jens Adolph Kjoge, acting Governor	
21 April 1788 to 23 October 1789	Johan Friedrich Kipnasse, acting Governor	
23 October 1789 to July 1792	Andreas Rieselsen Bjørn, Governor	
July 1792 to 25 January 1793	Andreas Hammer, acting Governor	
25 January 1793 to 30 June 1793	Andreas Hammer, Governor	
30 June 1793 to 3 August 1793	Bendt Olrich, Governor	
3 August 1793 to 17 August 1795	Baron Christian Friedrich von Hager, Governor	
October 1795 to 31 December 1799	Johan Peter David Wrisberg, Governor	1st Term
31 December 1799 to 3 December 1802	Johan David Ahnholm, acting Governor	
3 December 1802 to 15 April 1807	Johan Peter David Wrisberg, Governor	2nd Term
15 April 1807 to 1 March 1817	Christian Schiønning, Governor	
3 March 1817 to 5 October 1817	Johan Emanuel Rechter, Governor	
5 October 1817 to 6 May 1819	Jens Nikolas Cornelius Reiersen, acting Governor	
6 May 1819 to 1 January 1821	Christian Svanekjaer, acting Governor	
1 January 1821 to 5 September 1821	Peter Svane Steffens, Governor	
5 September 1821 to 23 December 1823	Matthias Thønning, acting Governor	
23 December 1823 to 7 May 1825	Johan Christopher von Richelieu, Governor	
7 May 1825 to 30 September 1827	Niels Brøch, acting Governor	1st Term
30 September 1827 to 1 August 1828	Jens Peter Flindt, Governor	
1 August 1828 to 20 January 1831	Heinrich Gerhard Lind, acting Governor	1st Term
29 January 1831 to 21 October 1831	Ludwig Vincent von Hein, Governor	
21 October 1831 to 4 December 1831	Helmut von Arenstorff, Governor	
4 December 1831 to 1 March 1833	Niels Brøch, Governor	2nd Term
1 March 1833 to 21 July 1833	Heinrich Gerhard Lind, acting Governor	2nd Term
21 July 1833 to 26 December 1834	Edvard von Gandil, acting Governor	
26 December 1834 to 19 August 1837	Frederik Segfried Mørch, acting Governor	
19 August 1837 to 18 March 1839	Frederik Segfried Mørch, Governor	
19 March 1839 to 18 August 1839	Hans Angel Giede, acting Governor	
18 August 1839 to 24 May 1842	Lucas Dall, acting Governor	
24 May 1842 to 26 August 1842	Bernhard Johan Christian Wilkens, acting Governor	
26 August 1842 to 15 March 1844	Edvard James Arnold Carstensen, acting Governor	1st Term
18 March 1844 to 5 July 1844	Edvard Ericksen, acting Governor	
5 July 1844 to 9 October 1844	George Lutterodt, acting Governor	
9 August 1844 to 10 April 1847	Edvard James Arnold Carstensen, Governor	2nd Term
10 April 1847 to 20 February 1850	Rasmus Eric Schmidt, acting Governor	
30 March 1850	Gold Coast Settlements sold to Britain and incorporated into the Gold Coast Colony	

== See also ==
- Colonial Heads of Ghana (Gold Coast)
  - Colonial Heads of Brandenburger Gold Coast
  - Colonial Heads of Dutch Gold Coast
  - Colonial Heads of Portuguese Gold Coast
  - Colonial Heads of Prussian Gold Coast
  - Colonial Heads of Swedish Gold Coast
- Brandenburger Gold Coast
- British Gold Coast
- Danish Gold Coast
- Dutch Gold Coast
- Portuguese Gold Coast
- Prussian Gold Coast
- Swedish Gold Coast
- Ghana
  - Heads of State of Ghana
  - Heads of Government of Ghana
