= Crull =

Crull is a surname. Notable people with the surname include:

- August Crull (1845–1923), German-American Lutheran theologian and writer
- Conrad Crull, 17th-century Danish politician
- Eldon Jacob Crull (1859–1917), American politician
- Elgin English Crull (1908–1976), American politician
- Elise Crull (born 1982), American philosopher and historian of physics
- Ford Crull (born 1954), American neo-symbolist abstract artist
- Friedrich Crull (1822–1911), German medical doctor, historian and archivist
- Jacob Crull, USL soccer player
- Jan Crull Jr., Native American rights advocate, attorney and filmmaker
- Jodocus Crull (1660–1713), English writer
- Kelly Crull (born 1984), American sportscaster and television personality
- Pieter Hofstede Crull (1862–1925), Dutch jurist and colonial administrator
- Rento Hofstede Crull (1863–1938), Dutch industrialist
- Thera Hofstede Crull (1900–1966), Dutch ceramist and humanitarian
- Robert Crull (1349–1408), Irish civil servant
- Robert de Crull (1329–1378), English king's minister
- Wilhelm Crull (1876–1956), German consular official
