= Debra Drexler =

American painter

- Born: April 13, 1958 (age 67); St. Louis, Missouri
- Education: Southern Illinois University; Webster University; Northwestern University; San Francisco Art Institute
- Known for: Artist
- Website: debradrexler.com

Debra Drexler (born 1958) is an American painter, installation artist, curator and professor. Her work is informed both by participating in the contemporary resurgence of abstraction coming out of New York, and by living in the Post Colonial Pacific since 1992. She has participated in over 30 solo and over 100 group exhibitions in national and international venues. Drexler is a professor at the University of Hawaiʻi at Mānoa, where she is chair of the Drawing and Painting Area. She maintains studios in Brooklyn, New York, and Kailua, Hawaii.

== Work ==
=== Abstract painting ===
Drexler's most recent work is highly experimental large-scale abstract painting. In a recent review of a two-person exhibition (Whitehot Magazine, 2017) Drexler's work as clearly referencing the long tradition of American abstraction and the established legacy of the New York School. The reviewer, Jonathan Goodman, described the work as a “new non-objectivity” that comes out of the current moment. He states that Drexler's painting “quite accurately describes the spirit of abstract art today, in which painting is struggling to break free of the constraints of time."

She frequently uses hot pink, a color with heavily gendered associations. Her hot pink brushstrokes reference the “heroic” marks associated with action painting, and feminize them.

The luminosity and high key saturation in Drexler's work are created through multiple layers of glazing of pigment mixed with polymer and alkyd media. Some of her color choices reference the post-digital experience with its highly saturated synthetic color. The luminosity and saturation also mirror the unique quality of light and the over-the-top, tropical color interactions in Hawaii.

=== Gauguin’s Zombie ===
“Gauguin’s Zombie” developed over seven years of research and art making between 1998 and 2005, and was exhibited at Honolulu Museum of Art (2002), Maui Arts and Cultural Center (2003) and Box-The Annex (2005). Based on the premise that Paul Gauguin, French painter and visitor to the South Pacific, has returned to life in a fictional exhibition in a fictional museum, this installation explores the complex dynamics between the past and present, the influence of colonialism and cultural identity, and the traditions of the Western and non-Western worlds. The installation included large-scale paintings, woodcarvings, a thatched hut, and fabricated writings such as emails, faxes, press releases, journal entries, and artist's statements.

In The Transatlantic Zombie (Rutgers, 2015) Sarah Juliet Lauro, states "Drexler's reworkings of Gauguin's painting are a zombie project as well as a project representing the zombie: these are essentially the dead works of Gauguin made strange and given new life, but they definitively refashioned as a critique of Gauguin's work, and its, I would say starkly uncritical chronicle of empire."

In “Debra Drexler: Resuscitating Gauguin” in NY Arts Magazine (May/June 2005), Molly Kleiman states, “The installation, an exercise in post-colonial appropriations and feminist inversions, is playful and subversive. She explores themes obliquely and cleverly, forcing no brittle lessons about the conflicts of post-colonial, no stubborn treatise on the poisonous male gaze. She doesn’t need to.”

In Gauguin's Challenge: New Perspectives after Modernism edited by Norma Broude (Bloomsbury, 2018), Heather Waldroup writes, “The themes of the exhibition are wide-ranging, including a critique of ethnographic museums and, in particular, their display of human remains; the commercialization of the museum through gift show sales; and the continued validity of modernism in contemporary art worlds (Drexler is, primarily an abstract painter).”

=== Shadow Play ===
Between 2007 and 2010, Drexler worked on a series in which the imagery became more abstract, leading her to her current body of abstraction. In a review of Shadow Play at HP Garcia Gallery, Michael Carter wrote in A Gathering of the Tribes Magazine (June 25, 2010), ” Like the most powerful abstract paintings of the last century, reproductions can only provide a crude chart of her stratagem; the luminosity of the oils themselves, along with their deft application can really only be truly appreciated in person. These are rare works, which show an artist struggling with and for the spirit.”

== Exhibitions and recognition ==
Some significant venues that have exhibited her work include Exit Art, New York (2010–11), White Box–The Annex (solo, 2005), Honolulu Museum, Hawaii (solo, 2002), and The Schaefer International Gallery of Maui Arts and Cultural Center, Hawaii (solo, 2003). Drexler's work was selected for “The Intuitionist” at The Drawing Center (2014) which also featured the work of Kara Walker. In “From Here to There” at Art Finance Partners, New York, curated by Robert Edelman, the legacy of the New York School and its connection to contemporary painters was explored. She exhibited with historically significant painters, including Willem de Kooning, Sol LeWitt, Yayoi Kusama, and Frank Stella. She has a forthcoming three-person exhibition at Maui Arts and Cultural Center (2020).

Drexler is represented by Front Room Gallery, New York, and has worked with a number of galleries in New York, Brooklyn, and New Jersey, including The Dorado Project (solo, 2016), Van Der Plas Gallery (solo, 2018, 2017, and 2015; three person – with Peggy Cyphers and Ford Crull, 2014), Gallery Gary Giordano (two-person, 2017), and H.P. Garcia Gallery (solo, 2009, 2010)). Group exhibition venues include The Curator Gallery, Ground Floor Gallery, Denise Bibro, Sideshow Gallery, Stephan Stoyanov Gallery, and Creon Gallery.

In 2017 Drexler received strong reviews in Whitehot Magazine and Arte Fuse, and was featured on The Kalm Report. Drexler's installation, Gauguin's Zombie, which toured from the Honolulu Museum (2002) to Maui Arts and Culture Center (2003) to White Box-The Annex, New York (2005), continues to be cited in academic publications such as The Transatlantic Zombie: Slavery, Rebellion and Living Death (Rutgers University Press, 2015), and in Gauguin's Challenge: New Perspectives After Postmodernism, (Bloomsbury, 2018). “Gauguin’s Zombie” was reviewed in New York Arts Magazine, Artweek Magazine, The Contemporary Pacific, Honolulu Weekly, Honolulu Star Advertiser, and The Maui News.

== Education and early career ==
Drexler was born in St. Louis, Missouri, and worked as a professional model from the age of 2 to 7. As an undergraduate Drexler studied film, theater and painting at Northwestern University, San Francisco Art Institute, and Webster University. She holds an MFA in painting from Southern Illinois University at Edwardsville (1986).

In 1986, she co-founded the non-profit Riverfaces in St. Louis with Ann Julien, which sought to create a positive sense of community identity through free arts workshops and an annual parade featuring giant puppets and thousands of masked participants. She served as Director of Riverfaces from 1986 to 1990. Following graduate school, she also had a number of exhibitions and reviews, including a 1991 review of her solo show at Utopian Loft (St. Louis) curated by Jerald Ieans in the New Art Examiner.

In 1992, Drexler was hired in the area of drawing and painting at the University of Hawaii at Manoa. During the 1990s Drexler's narrative work dealt with a number of themes, including feminism, the depiction of women in art and colonialism. In 1999, she spent a sabbatical in Australia, where she developed the idea for "Gauguin's Zombie". Notable early exhibitions include the solo exhibitions Postcards from Oahu at the Sarratt Gallery Vanderbilt University (1997), Bushlands at Northern Territory University in Darwin Australia. (1998), High Art and Low Life at Gallery 210 at the University of Missouri-St. Louis (2004).

== Curatorial practice ==
Drexler has curated a number of exhibitions in Australia, New York and Hawaii. Most notably she co-curated New New York with Liam Davis, which was exhibited at the Art Gallery of the University of Hawai’i and The Curator Gallery which was founded by former Time, Inc. CEO Ann Moore. Artists exhibited at the UH venue included Terry Winters, Julie Mehretu, Barbara Takenaga, and Odili Donald Odita.

== Personal life ==
Drexler has one son, Leland Drexler-Russell (born 1989), who is an American sculptor and installation artist. He is the co-founder and fabrication director of Otherworld, an interactive art installation in Columbus, Ohio.
