= Amy Zerner and Monte Farber =

American astrologers

Amy Zerner
- Born: March 23, 1951; Teaneck, New Jersey, United States
- Education: Pratt Institute
- Occupations: Artist, illustrator, fashion designer, author
- Spouse: Monte Farber (m. 1978)
- Writing career
- Genre: Mind/Body/Spirit
- Notable works: The Enchanted Tarot; jointly with Farber: The Enchanted Tarot; Love, Light and Laughter

Monte Farber
- Born: January 22, 1950; Brooklyn, New York, United States
- Occupations: Author, astrologer
- Spouse: Amy Zerner (m. 1978)
- Writing career
- Genre: Mind/Body/Spirit
- Notable works: Karma Cards; Quantum Affirmations

Amy Zerner (born 1951) and Monte Farber (b. 1950) are a married duo of writers and illustrators active in the fields of astrology and spirituality. As a couple, they had, as of October 2017, written approaching 50 published works, and had approaching 3 million copies in print. On these, Farber has served as the primary author, while Zerner both writes and illustrates. The couple published their first book in 1988, and their subsequently published works have appeared in 17 languages.

== Early lives and educations ==
Amy Zerner was born into a family of artists. Her maternal grandfather, Clayton Victor Spicer, was a Chicago Art Institute-trained painter of portraits and rural Pennsylvania landscapes; her mother, Jessie Zerner, was a prolific artist who earned a living as an illustrator of children's books. Per their 2002 autobiographical memoir, Zerner made hundreds of "collage tapestries", with formal examples dating to at least 1975.

In 1967, Zerner's family moved to East Hampton, New York "from an even smaller town in Pennsylvania". After graduating from East Hampton High School in 1969, she enrolled in the Pratt Institute in Brooklyn to study art; her father also died that year. As stated in their 2002 autobiographical memoir, by 1974, she had begun night courses at the School of Visual Arts and had moved into designing theatrical props under the guidance of Tony Walton, including for a Broadway run of the musical, Chicago.

Monte Farber describes himself in the couple's 2002 autobiographical memoir as "big for my age but sensitive and psychic", with a father in the New York City Police (NYPD) assigned to the 74th Precinct in Prospect Park; his father would make the rank of sergeant by Farber's late teen years, and in earlier life his father's precinct house was "both [his] playground and a safe haven from neighborhood bullies".

As further stated in that memoir, while acknowledging that being father to the junior Farber would have been difficult, Monte Farber nevertheless describes his father—who is presented as being "single", as having been in a "horrible marriage", and, more subjectively, as essentially juvenile, and "making up for lost time")—as ejecting him from their home at age 17, for reasons involving misunderstanding, and fatherly overreaction (to his failure to visit his father in hospital).

Farber goes on to state in the autobiography that, thereafter, he "really called Prospect Park my home, [for a while] sleeping on benches", while lying to his friends in embarrassment about his father's reasoning (saying he'd done the ejection after "finding lots of drugs" on his son, an implausible misdirection given Monte Farber's claim of having been a tee-totaler to that point); then, for a time, the son reports staying with a heroin-using fellow musician (with a Jamaican roommate who would later die violently), a second arrangement in his homelessness that Monte Farber describes as a "long arduous rite of passage into manhood".

== Careers ==
=== Music ===
Farber's initial career direction was music; by 1969, he had joined a progressive rock band called The Flow which played free concerts to protest the Vietnam War—including at the Central Park Bandstand, Baruch College, and later at a 1972 campaign rally for George McGovern. The couple states that that they had met in October 1974, began dating, and married in 1978. By 1978, his music career was burgeoning, and featured in The New York Times in an article focusing on his performances with Roland the Robot, a musical automaton of his own creation.

As stated in their 2002 autobiographical memoir, Farber continued to pursue a musical career, but struggled to enter the mainstream industry, turning to film and television, and working in the mid-1980s for WNET and as a location manager and personal bodyguard on the films A Chorus Line (1985), The Last Dragon (1985), The Money Pit (1986), and The Secret of My Success (1987). As further stated in their autobiographical memoir, facing both professional and personal difficulties, the couple decided to refocus their lives on the shared passions of astrology, tarot, and creativity.

=== Publishing ===
By the time of the Roland the Robot feature in The New York Times, both Farber and Zerner had become interested in astrology, with Farber providing sun sign astrology columns for the Hamptons-based lifestyle publication Dan's Papers, and Zerner featuring astrological imagery and symbolism in her tapestry art.

In the mid-1980s, Farber and Zerner decided to combine their interests in astrology, writing, and art into a publication. Farber's first book and card set, Karma Cards, was published in 1988 by Penguin Books and sold over 300,000 copies worldwide. Following this success, the couple state in interview that they collaborated on the book, The Enchanted Tarot, published by St. Martin's Press in 1992, where they stated that Farber provided the text, and Zerner spent 2 years creating the art. The book was another major success, selling over 250,000 copies worldwide. More books followed, which included the pair's self-help relationship guide Love, Light and Laughter (2002), Farber's lifestyle guide Quantum Affirmations (2012), and the astrology-based cookbook Signs & Seasons (2017).

The couple remained productive during the COVID-19 pandemic, publishing 3 books in 2020–21.

=== Jewelry, clothing, and other media ===
By 2011, Zerner had designed clothing, and jewelry, the latter for Bergdorf Goodman and celebrity clients.

Farber developed a tarot reading software application and exhibited at the Consumer Electronics Show in 1996. In 2020, Zerner and Farber hosted the online weekly talk show Ask the Oracles together with family friend Jeff Pulver.

=== Sales and marketing ===
As claimed in their 2002 autobiographical memoir, the pair were the first astrologers to sell tarot card products on national television, with appearances on QVC and HSN starting in the 1990s. As they state in their promotional materials for their astrology and publishing business, in addition to their published books, they have produced card decks, divination sets, and meditation CDs.

In 2006, Farber and Zerner established a publication deal with Barnes & Noble's imprint Sterling Publishing.

=== Art ===
Zerner's development as an artist continued after meeting Farber and gradually evolved into collage-based paintings on fabric. In 1986, she received a National Endowment for the Arts fellowship for her creative work in this style. The Endowment allowed her to expand the scale and complexity of her work, including a large work for public display at the City University of New York. Her first collaboration with Farber consisted of the illustrations for The Enchanted Tarot in 1992, which were subsequently showcased as full tapestries.

As she describes to a substantial extent at her own webpage, but for which there is also some independent reporting, Zerner has had solo and group exhibitions through the Women's Caucus for Art (1983), and at university campuses and museums, including:

- Eastern Kentucky University (1983),
- State University of New York at Stony Brook (1984),
- Pacific Lutheran University (1988),
- State University of New York at Plattsburgh (1989),
- Lebanon Valley College (1996),
- Parrish Art Museum (1984, 1985; latter works chosen by Audrey Flack),
- the East Hampton Center for Contemporary Art (1985),
- the Rubin Museum of Art (2010), and
- the University of North Texas ArtSpace Dallas (2015–16).

=== Fashion ===
As stated in their 2002 autobiographical memoir, Zerner's interest in fashion design dated back to her youth. As further states in that memoir, she claims to have continued to work as a young adult with designs for accessories and props for the theatre. Following the awarding of her NEA grant, she moved into applying the same painting and construction techniques she used for her tapestries to articles of clothing. Zerner used the Tibetan panel coat in the style used for religious ceremonies; the central panel of the coat was ideal for decoration with silks, brocades, and other fabrics to compose metaphysical images. In 1999, after being approached by New York-based Bergdorf Goodman, Zerner was commissioned to produce several pieces. Subsequently, Zerner continued to produce art coats for Bergdorf Goodman and on commission from clients, with custom couture produced for Simon Kirke, Patti LaBelle, Oprah Winfrey, Shirley MacLaine, and Elizabeth Taylor. Zerner has also produced jewelry for Bergdorf Goodman worn by Rihanna and Kylie Jenner.

=== Notable published works ===
Zerner and Farber have, as of October 2017, written "close to 50 different published works", appearing in 17 languages, with "nearly three million copies in print".

==== Jointly authored works ====
- Farber, Monte & Zerner, Amy (2002). Love, Light and Laughter (autobiographical self-help memoir). Newburyport, MA: Red Wheel Weiser. ISBN 9781590030073. For the publisher's page for this work, see this link.

==== Single author works ====
- Farber, Monte (1988). Karma Cards: A New Age Guide to Your Future Through Astrology (paperback) (1st, illustrated ed.). New York, NY: Penguin Books Ltd. ISBN 9780140953459.
- —, — (2012). Quantum Affirmations: The New Energy Science of Conscious Manifestation (1st ed.). Newburyport, MA: Red Wheel Weiser. ISBN 9781609255978. For the publisher's page for this work, see this link.

==== Works authored with others ====
- "Signs & Seasons". HarperCollins. 2017. Archived from the original on October 1, 2022.

== Personal lives ==
As stated in their 2002 autobiographical memoir, Farber and Zerner met in October 1974 during the making of Up the Girls, a pornographic film intended as the first "feminist adult production"; Farber played a role in a percussion band in a crowd scene, while Zerner played an invited guest. The two began dating, and married in 1978.

As of the publication of their autobiographical memoir, in 2002, Zerner and Farber were living in East Hampton, New York, in Zerner's childhood home. As of October 2017, Zerner and Farber were described as "working together in their East Hampton studio".
