= Cloud Communications Alliance =

Logo of Cloud Communications Alliance

The Cloud Communications Alliance (CCA) comprises eight hosted IP voice and data communications companies. Launched in April 2010 and creating some stir in the industry, the CCA's mission is to promote awareness of the new standard called cloud communications and drive its development through the pursuit of new technical standards, capabilities and applications. The CCA also delivers services as a group.

Founding members of the Cloud Communications Alliance are:

- Alteva
- Broadcore
- Callis Communications
- Consolidated Technologies Inc.
- IPFone
- SimpleSignal
- Stage 2 Networks
- Telesphere

Clark Peterson, CEO of Telesphere, is the first and current chairman of the CCA. Together, the regionally owned and operated companies represent more than $100 million in combined annual revenue and collectively serve more than 110,000 business customers in the United States.

Each member of the CCA owns and operates facilities-based, dedicated Multiprotocol Label Switching (MPLS) IP infrastructure that jointly create a cloud-based nationwide, end-to-end high-definition voice/video network to deliver higher voice quality and more user features at a lower cost. This network routes calls from one user to another without touching the Public Switched Telephone Network (PSTN).

The CCA has a code of ethics to assure high standards in all dealings with CCA members. Code enforcement is handled by an ethics committee which can render sanctions, including suspension or expulsion from the CCA.
