= Zula (app) =

Mobile software for communication

- Industry: Software
- Founded: 2013
- Founders: Jeff Pulver; Jacob Ner-David
- Key people: Raz Yalov (CEO); Hillel Fuld (CMO)
- Products: Mobile communications

Zula, pronounced Zoo-lah (noun), is a mobile application designed for work communication. It was founded in late 2013 by Jeff Pulver, co-founder of Vonage and an angel investor at Twitter, and Jacob Ner-David, co-founder of Deltathree. Zula envisions future developments that will allow the creation of custom apps on its platform, providing companies with a personalized collaboration experience.

Zula has been recognized as "WhatsApp for Business". In February 2015, Fast Company acknowledged Zula's innovation by listing it as one of "The World's Top 10 Most Innovative Companies of 2015 in Israel," securing the ninth position.
