= ICore Networks =

American network as a service provider

iCore Networks
- Type: Subsidiary
- Industry: Telecommunications
- Founded: 2001; 25 years ago
- Founder: Stephen Canton
- Defunct: August 2015
- Fate: Acquired
- Successor: Vonage
- Headquarters: McLean, Virginia, United States
- Area served: United States
- Products: Voice over IP, networks
- Number of employees: 75 (2010)
- Parent: Vonage
- Website: www.icore.com

iCore Networks is an American network as a service provider with headquarters in McLean, Virginia. It specializes in platforms for VoIP networks.

Founded in 2001, the company was known as the largest hosted unified applications and communications company as well as being listed as an Inc. 5000 company. iCore agreed to be purchased by Vonage for $92 million in August 2015.

== History ==
iCore Networks was founded in 2001 by Stephen Canton, a business executive who worked for Excel Communications prior to founding iCore Networks. He launched the company in 2003 with a $7 million personal investment and the company signed its first customer in 2004. The company's services included managing VoPI networks, similar to VoIP networks. As opposed to using private point to point circuits like VoIP, iCore Networks uses a managed and hosted end-to-end system to eliminate poor call quality. The company raised an additional $6.4 million in capital in 2006 that the company used to upgrade its network facilities. It also partnered with Global Telecom & Technology in 2008 in order to strengthen its infrastructure. By 2009 the company reported revenues of approximate $25 million per year.

As of 2010, iCore Networks has boasted of having more than 75 employees and a 98% approval rating from approximately 27,000 users. The same year, it expanded operations in 2010 by adding an office in Columbia, Maryland. Two years later in 2012, iCore Networks relocated the Columbia office to a larger facility in the same town. Its customer base doubled in the two years prior to the relocation, with the company adding 40 employees. In 2012 iCore Networks acquired cloud communications provider, Always On Call. With the acquisition, iCore Networks expanded its cloud solutions to include Unified Communications (UC), Virtual Desktop Infrastructure (VDI), Microsoft Application Collaboration, and Desktop Virtualization.

== Recognition ==
In 2010 it was named one of Top 25 Best Technology Firms in Washington D.C. as well being ranked #10 Fastest Growing Companies in Washington by the Washington Business Journal. It has been listed as an Inc. 5000 company, as well as being ranked as high as #29 on the Inc. 500 list.
