= Jeff Pulver =

American Internet entrepreneur (born 1962)

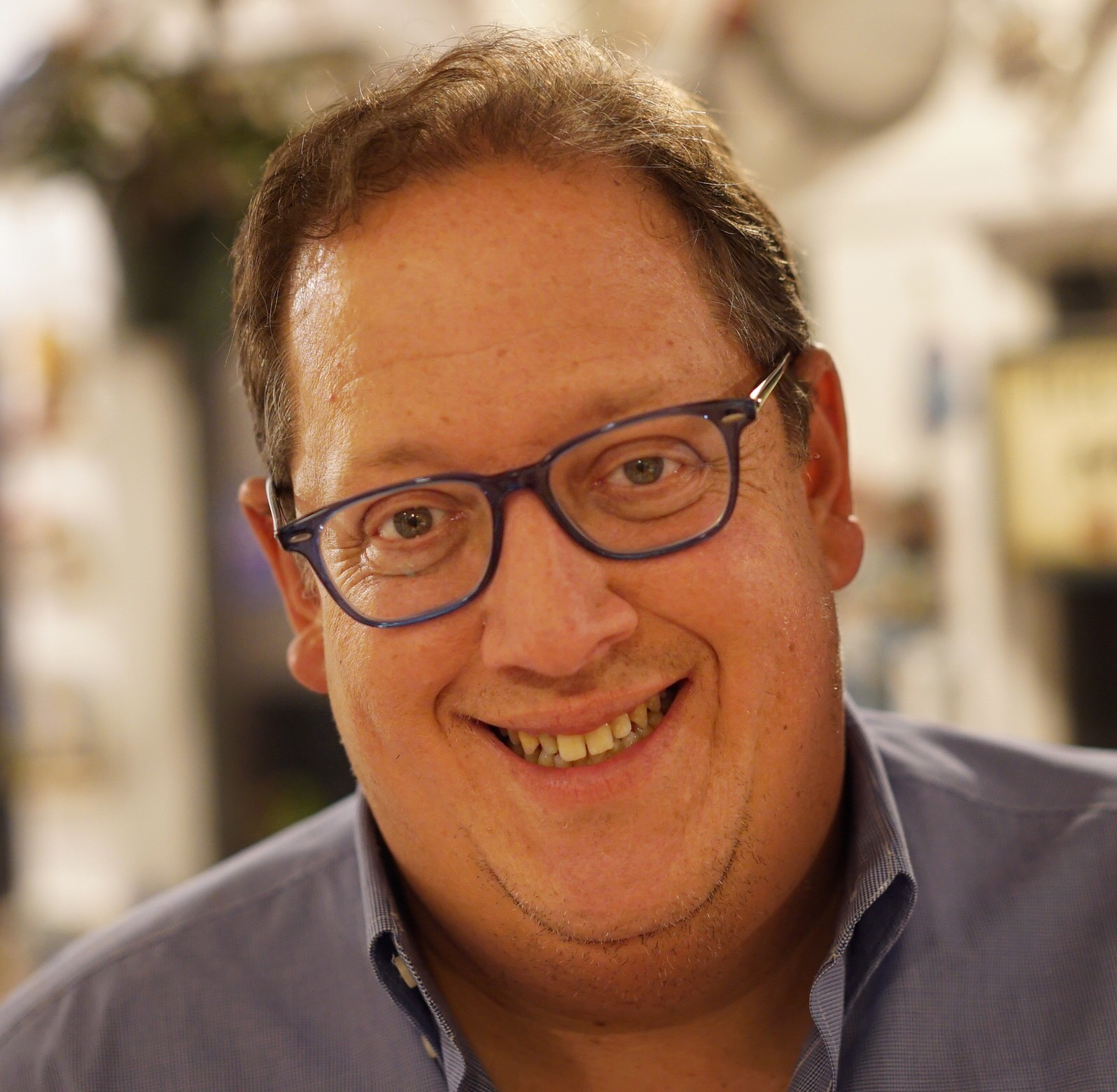
- Pulver in February 2019
- Born: September 12, 1962 (age 64); Kings Point, New York, U.S.
- Occupation: Internet entrepreneur
- Call sign: WA2BOT
- Website: pulver.com

Jeff Pulver is an American Internet entrepreneur and futurist known for his work as an innovator in the field of Voice over Internet Protocol (VoIP). Pulver's early work in VoIP with his company Free World Dialup led to a significant regulatory decision by the Federal Communications Commission in 2004 which classified VoIP as an internet application, rather than as a telephony service which would be subject to government tariffs and regulations, a decision which paved the way for the development of video and voice internet communications.

A serial entrepreneur who has invested in over 400 startups, Pulver is also known for his work as the co-founder of Vonage, the VON Coalition, Vivox, and Zula, as well as for his early investments in Twitter and Foursquare. Pulver's latest ventures have included the development of Web3 applications, including the issuances of non-fungible tokens (NFTs) and cryptocurrencies. In addition to working with partner companies, he has also had a cryptocurrency issued in his honor, and designed and issued his own NFTs. He has organized conferences and spoken extensively on the development of VoIP telephony, the evolution of the internet, and technological futurism, and created an online school, pulveREDU, centered on internet technology topics. During the COVID-19 pandemic, he moved his conference activities online branded under the Jeff Pulver Entertainment banner, with his latest events, the Web3-focused VON3 Summit and Blue Lava Conference, having taken place in January and February 2022. He is also engaged in lobbying activities for the need to develop an alternative to government regulation of internet and telecommunication applications.

== Early life and education ==
Jeff Pulver grew up in a Jewish family in Kings Point, New York. As a child, he was introduced to amateur radio by his uncle Fred Pulver, who worked in cable television. Developing an immediate interest in the technology, he sought and obtained an amateur radio license at age 12 after a three-and-a-half-year process. By the time he was a teenager, in the dawn of the personal computer age, he began creating software to track his radio contest logs. At age 18, his interest in tinkering led him to improvise a way to make telephone calls from his car by connecting a two-way radio to his home phone. Using amateur radio to talk with people all over the world helped spark his lifelong interest in international communication technology. Pulver later stated that "it was amateur radio that unlocked my connection to voice over IP." Pulver's interest in amateur radio continued until the 1990s when he redirected his efforts into internet telephony, and he retains the call sign WA2BOT.

Pulver graduated from Great Neck North High School in 1980, and subsequently attended Hofstra University, where he graduated with a degree in accounting. Throughout his high school and college years, he earned extra money as a freelance computer programmer and running his own small consulting company, which provided an entry to his eventual career path.

== Career ==
=== Beginnings in accounting and computing ===
Pulver began his career in accounting and was hired out of college by a client of his consulting firm, New York-based Margolin, Winer & Evens LLP, in 1984. Within his first year at the company, he convinced his supervisors to offer computer services to clients. Two years later in 1987, while still at the firm, he founded a new business, Spreadsheet Solutions Corp. to market add-ins for Lotus 1-2-3 and Microsoft Excel. Margolin, Winer & Evens invested initial venture capital in this company. Pulver's ownership and management of Spreadsheet Solutions Corp. provided the next step in his career when he sold the company to Cantor Fitzgerald in the early 1990s. As a result of the sale, Pulver and his small team were subsumed into Cantor Fitzgerald's IT department. By the mid 1990s, he had become a vice president of information technology at the company.

=== Free World Dialup and the establishment of Voice over Internet Protocol ===
During this time, Pulver became interested in the nascent technology of Voice over Internet Protocol (VoIP). While the earliest forms of this technology were initially developed in the 1970s, it was in the early 1990s that advances in computer technology allowed the first proper software and internet applications to be developed in Israel by VocalTec. The first consumer-level application for VoIP, VocalTec's Internet Phone (IPhone), was launched shortly thereafter in February 1995. Members of the amateur radio community adopted the use of the IPhone program, and Pulver became one of the application's most prominent proponents, speaking on behalf of VocalTec's interests and establishing a mailing list of early users. In September 1995, Pulver teamed first with Izak Jenie, and later Brandon Lucas, to establish an experimental platform for VoIP communications called Free World Dialup. Subscribers to the platform could communicate with one another, but not with others outside the platform. In November, Pulver officially launched Free World Dialup as the world's first internet telephony network, as well as the first true VoIP business venture, incorporating the platform with the IPhone technology. Pulver pursued all of these activities at night while simultaneously holding his day job at Cantor Fitzgerald. Seeking a term to encapsulate these emerging technological applications, he coined the acronym 'VON' (which stood for Voice/Video On the Net), which would later provide both nomenclature for the industry and the origin for many of Pulver's later companies and organizations.

By March 1996, interest in VoIP and Free World Dialup had increased, and 300 companies involved in the telephone and telecommunications industry filed a joint petition with the Federal Communications Commission (FCC) requesting that the sale and operation of internet telephony software be banned in the United States, and that the makers of the software be regulated in the same manner as traditional phone companies. Ten days after the petition was filed, Pulver launched his first lobbying organization, the VON Coalition; 110 companies from around the world quickly joined. As leader of the group, Pulver organized the initial opposition to FCC regulation of VoIP. He also wrote a book, The Internet Telephony Toolkit, which offered explanations of the technology and predictions for the industry's future. Pulver's expertise and advocacy led to him being identified as "the internet telephony industry's first celebrity and most vociferous proponent." While becoming more and more involved in these activities, Pulver became disenchanted with his work at Cantor Fitzgerald. In July 1996, after suggesting the company embrace some of the internet innovations he had become involved in, Pulver was fired.

=== Establishing the VON Conference ===
Searching for future prospects, and inspired by a conference he had attended earlier that year in London, Pulver established The Talking Net conference, the first such event in the United States centered on internet telephony technology. The inaugural event occurred in September 1996 in New York, with a group of 224 international attendees. The following year, Pulver changed the name of the event to the VON Conference and held the first event under that name in San Francisco in April 1997. The event soon became a prominent technology conference with biannual shows in the United States, as well as annual shows in Europe from 1998-2007, and an event in Hong Kong in the year 2000. The success of the conference attracted the interest of Key3Media, organizer of the influential COMDEX trade show, and Pulver agreed to sell the business for $40 million. The deal closed on September 10, 2001; the following day, the offices of Pulver's former employer Cantor Fitzgerald, which were located in the North Tower of the World Trade Center, were destroyed in the September 11 attacks. More than 400 of his former colleagues died in the attack. Pulver later credited his journey into VoIP, and the subsequent loss of his job it resulted in, with inadvertently saving his life. During the time period when Key3Media owned the conference, Pulver remained as a consultant, and Key3Media expanded the event series to include franchised and partnered VON Conferences in Mexico, Israel, Canada, Russia, and China. By 2003, as a result of losses stemming from the September 11 attacks, Key3Media filed for bankruptcy, and Pulver repurchased the VON Conference for an undisclosed amount. After reacquiring the business, the conferences continued to gain importance, becoming a center of industry dealmaking and attracting thousands of attendees to each event. Live music and entertainment was also a focus, with groups including Smash Mouth, the Goo Goo Dolls, John Cafferty and the Beaver Brown Band, Lifehouse, Train, and Counting Crows performing at the conferences. Through providing live music and entertainment at the conferences, Pulver learned and emphasized the importance of fun in business and for producing successful events. Pulver continued to host and produce the conference until 2008, when ownership of the conference again changed hands.

=== Founding Min-X.com and the evolution of Vonage ===
In 1998, while simultaneously running the VON Conference and continuing his lobbying work with the Von Coalition, Pulver founded a new venture, Min-X.com, to serve as a VoIP exchange for the purchase and sale of unused carrier minutes. As with traditional telephone services, carriers buy, sell, and trade minutes between one another anonymously to ensure continuous global service and coverage. As opposed to traditional telephone minutes, which are referred to as 'black and white minutes', the minutes used by VoIP applications are called 'purple minutes', a term coined by Pulver. Seeking to expand the company's prospects, he recruited Jeffrey A. Citron and Carlos Bhola to serve as board members. Citron and Bhola each invested $1 million of their own money, and then jointly raised a further $11 million from other backers. With the new financing, the company pivoted to become a VoIP service provider. In 2001, the company changed its name to Vonage. Citron and Bhola subsequently became CEO and president, respectively, while Pulver remained on the company's board until 2002, when he left to focus on a refresh of his first VoIP company, Free World Dialup. Vonage subsequently grew into a leading business communications services and cloud computing company; in November 2021, it was acquired by Ericsson for $6.2 billion.

=== Lobbying activities and the Pulver Order ===
During his time running Min-X.com, Pulver became increasingly involved in his lobbying activities on behalf of VoIP interests. Action by traditional telecommunications companies, which had initially begun with the challenge against Free World Dialup in 1996, remained ongoing throughout this time, while the VON Coalition continued to push back. In March 1999, Michigan congressman Fred Upton first introduced H.R.1291, which would have lifted major FCC regulations over internet services. When a revised version of the bill, which was modified to place regulation over internet telephony and VoIP applications, passed in the United States House of Representatives in May 2000, Pulver organized the Internet Freedom Rally, a protest which took place on the steps of the United States Capitol on June 11, 2000 and included a performance by members of Voices of Classic Rock. The bill subsequently failed to pass in the Senate. The following year, another regulatory bill, H.R.1542, was introduced by Louisiana congressman Billy Tauzin; this bill contained provisions that, according to Pulver, could have subjected VoIP to regulation. In response, Pulver organized a second Internet Freedom Rally at the Capitol on June 24, 2001, which featured a concert by alternative rock band Stroke 9. Like the prior bill, H.R.1542 failed in the Senate.

Pulver's lobbying activities reached their high point following his departure from Vonage. As attempts at passing legislation continued in Washington, Pulver decided to use his early company, Free World Dialup, to force an FCC decision on whether VoIP applications were subject to regulation. In February 2003, he filed a petition requesting the FCC to rule that calls made on Free World Dialup's network would not be subject to traditional telephone regulations, and would also therefore not be subject to taxation. A year later, in February 2004, the FCC released an opinion and order which ruled in Pulver's favor and classified Free World Dialup, and by extension other VoIP applications, as information services. This meant that VoIP networks would, under law, be classified as internet applications, rather than telecommunications services. The decision, which would subsequently become known as the 'Pulver Order', provided the rationale for the FCC to avoid regulating VoIP networks, including the later development of videotelephony applications such Skype and FaceTime which utilize VoIP as their underlying technology.

Following the release of the Pulver Order, Pulver continued in his role with the VON Coalition, eventually becoming chairman emeritus of the organization. While gradually reducing his direct lobbying activities, he remained active in technology and public policy commentary, expressing opposition to the classification of broadband companies as "common carrier" telecommunications services in the debate over net neutrality.

=== Investments, startups, and inventions ===
Pulver spent much of the 2000s and 2010s investing in emerging companies, often as an early stage pre-angel investor, with such investments typically being non-liquid micro-minority shareholdings. Noteworthy investments during this time included the social media platform Twitter, location technology company Foursquare, social media management software firm Seesmic (later acquired by Hootsuite), online advertising software companies AdExtent and Innovid, event discovery app Fever, social media analytics company Klear (later acquired by Meltwater), video streaming company RayV (later acquired by Yahoo!), business event networking app developer Bizzabo, and e-retailer Zola Books. During this time, Pulver established strong ties within Israel's entrepreneurial community, backing many young creators and companies. In total, Pulver had invested in over 400 startups by the late 2010s.

In addition to investing in other companies, Pulver started many of his own. By 2003, he estimated he had founded at least 40 individual companies; these included an independent music label, Rev Up Records, which represented singer Eric Stuart. For another venture, WHP Wireless, Pulver collaborated with his uncle Fred, who had first introduced him to amateur radio, to invent and patent the CellSocket, a device which allowed users to make calls from a cellphone number using a landline. In 2005, he launched the integrated voice chat software company Vivox, which became a leading provider of in-game chat and audio services; the company was acquired by Unity Technologies in 2019. In 2013, Pulver launched the Israel-based startup Zula in conjunction with fellow technologist Jacob Ner-David; the company focused on providing business team communication software and raised over $3 million in investment from M12, Morton Meyerson, and other backers.

Pulver also continued to emphasize his production of live events and conferences. In 2009, he established the 140 Character Conference, an event series themed around Twitter and social media usage. By 2012, the conference series had become semi-franchised, with multiple iterations throughout the United States, including not-for-profit locally-focused events. The conference also held international events in London, Barcelona, and Tel Aviv. As with the earlier VON Conference, live music played a significant role in the events, with performers including Diane Birch, Maura Kennedy, and Andy Grammer. Pulver's association with Grammer led to him appearing in Grammer's "Keep Your Head Up" interactive music video in 2010. The conference series continued regularly until 2016, and was later revived as an online event in 2020. From 2016-2018, Pulver produced the MoNage Conference, which focused on the evolution of internet messaging technologies. Most recently, Pulver hosted the online VON3 Summit in January 2022, and served as a co-host of the Blue Lava Conference in February 2022.

=== Web3 and blockchain ventures ===
In the late 2010s and early 2020s, Pulver focused his attention on the emerging possibilities of decentralized, peer-to-peer internet applications, commonly known as Web3. In contrast to earlier systematic principles of the internet, Web3 is based upon the technology of public blockchains, in which information is decentralized across networks of individual users, rather than centralized within the auspices of services managed by large companies. Central to the identity of Web3's founding principles is that the community of users, rather than singular empowered interests, control the exchange of information. In 2019, Pulver joined the advisory board of First Growth Advisory, an Australian cryptocurrency-focused investment bank. In 2020, he worked with Debrief, a blockchain-based, cryptographically-secured middleware platform which can be used by existing communications applications for added security. Other related endeavors included serving as an advisor for TechBeach, a Caribbean-based financial technology conference organizer, and for Round Room Music, a Nashville-based music production company focused on digital exhibition and monetization using Web3 content issuances.

In addition to advisory and business ventures, Pulver has embraced Web3 principles, including the establishment of online communities and information exchanges, with his personal projects. In 2020, he established pulveREDU, an online videoconference school focusing on technology and internet community topics, as well as the online weekly talk show Ask the Oracles with astrological experts Amy Zerner and Monte Farber, and the weekly music performance show Jeff's Place. In 2021, he launched the internet television series The Creator Economy, which focused on interviews with innovators, entrepreneurs, and artists involved in technology and crowdsourced-related fields. That same year, he had a cryptocurrency issued in his honor by the Rally.io platform, and he introduced several lines of NFTs featuring original artwork, photography, and narrative stories.

== Personal life ==
Pulver rekindled his early interest in amateur radio in 2019 and has since actively used it to communicate with fellow enthusiasts worldwide. He is also interested in astrophotography and has released some of his photographs as NFTs. Starting in 2016, he has served as the host for chartered retreats in the Caribbean for participants interested in exploring personal enrichment activities, including stargazing and photography. Pulver has supported diabetes research by contributing to the Miller School of Medicine and the Barton Center for Diabetes Education, including by organizing a celebrity poker tournament. He has also organized fundraisers for WhyHunger and the Long Island Cares Harry Chapin Food Bank. A committed futurist, Pulver has been named as one of Bloomberg Businessweek's Gurus of Technology, and is frequently interviewed regarding developments in the internet and computer technology industries.
