= Telesphere =

- Trade name: Telesphere
- Company type: Private (until acquisition)
- Industry: Unified Communications as a Service (UCaaS), Telecommunications
- Founded: 2000
- Fate: Acquired by Vonage
- Area served: United States, Canada, Europe
- Key people: Clark Peterson (former CEO)
- Products: Hosted VoIP, Managed Video Bridging, MPLS Network Services, Private SIP Trunking, Mobile Integration, Cloud Communications Services
- Services: Unified Communications as a Service (UCaaS)
- Owner: Vonage (after acquisition)
- Parent: Vonage (after acquisition)

Telesphere is a nationwide Unified Communications as a Service provider for businesses. In 2003, Telesphere began providing highly secure cloud-based voice and data services over a private IP MPLS network to mid and large enterprises throughout the United States and now also in Europe. Telesphere provides hosted VoIP, managed video bridging, MPLS network services, private SIP trunking, mobile integration and many other cloud communications services. Services are available regardless of the geographic location throughout the United States.

== History ==
Telesphere was founded in 2000 and is backed and operated by investors who were affiliated with Cellular One/AT&T Wireless, Nextel, Nextlink, XO Communications, and Clearwire, drawing talent from telecom industry veterans with successful track records.

In September 2009, Telesphere acquired the VoIP services business of Denver-based IP services provider Unity Business Networks.

From mid-2008 through mid-2010, Telesphere raised more capital than any other venture backed privately held company in Arizona. Funding has featured several premier telecommunications investors including: Rally Capital, Hawkeye Investments and the Greenspun Corporation. Telesphere agreed to be acquired by Vonage for $114 million in November 2014.

== Current customers and sponsors ==
Telesphere currently supports customers across the US, Canada, and Europe. Telesphere is active with national charities, including the American Red Cross, Make-a-Wish Foundation, Southwest Human Development’s Adapt Shop, and the American Lung Association. Community involvement is multi-faceted, taking place at all levels of the organization. Telesphere actively participates in a Lunch Buddy Mentoring Program with Big Brothers Big Sisters; Making Strides; American Society Run/Walk; Make-a-Wish 5k Run; and, numerous other philanthropic events across the nation.

== Awards ==
- Telesphere Ranked No. 1 UCaaS Provider by Wainhouse Research’s ‘BroadSoft Provider Power Rankings–2014
- Telesphere Honored as One of the State’s Top 50 Largest Private Companies at Arizona Corporate Excellence Awards Night
- Telesphere Recognized as a Challenger in Unified Communications as a Service (UCaaS) in 2014 Gartner Magic Quadrant
- Telesphere Recognized as Inc. 500/5000 Fast-Growing Company
- Telesphere selected as one of the Top Companies to Work for in Arizona
- Telesphere Receives 2014 Unified Communications Product of the Year Award
- TMC's Internet Telephony Magazine - 2013 Unified Communications Award
- Deloitte - Technology Fast 500 Award
- Inc 500/5000 - Inc 5000 Fastest Growing companies in the US (3rd year in a row)
- Scottsdale Chamber of Commerce - 2013 Sterling Award Winner
- BestCompaniesAZ.com 2014 Arizona's Most Admired Companies Winner

== Cloud Communications Alliance ==
Telesphere is one of 23 technology companies that make up the Cloud Communications Alliance.

Clark Peterson, CEO of Telesphere, is the first and current chairman of the Cloud Communications Alliance.
