= East Hampton Center for Contemporary Art =

- Type: Non-profit
- Location: East Hampton, New York

The East Hampton Center for Contemporary Art (EHCCA) was a non-profit arts center and exhibition space located at 16R Newtown Lane in East Hampton, New York.

== History ==
EHCCA was founded in 1985 by artists Susan Tepper and Jennifer Cross. Tepper provided the majority of the funding and Cross served as Director and Curator from 1985 to 1991. The center's mission was to provide exhibition opportunities for deserving artists as well as sponsor lectures, readings, and site-specific outdoor sculpture projects to serve artists' needs and promote and encourage public appreciation of contemporary art.

The center's program was modeled after alternative venues such as Artists Space in New York City, and featured both established and emerging artists. During its six years of operation, EHCCA presented the work of more than 350 artists in 40 solo and group exhibitions. EHCCA was regularly cited by critics for its dedication to emerging artists, and its cutting-edge exhibition program. Exhibitions at EHCCA were often thematic and included artists from the region as well as national and international artists.

The EHCCA's inaugural exhibition was New Talent / New York an exhibition of four East Village Artists: Ford Crull, Leslie Lowinger, Gary Petri and Monika Misslbeck . Over the next six years EHCCA invigorated the East End art scene by bringing in artists from New York City and elsewhere. It invited guest curators to organize shows and it showcased the work of a number of young artists at the beginning of the careers, including Robert Harms, Lesley Dill and Ronald Gonzalez.

== Noteworthy exhibits ==
EHCCA was a champion of women artists. Noteworthy artists who exhibited work at the EHCCA include: Petah Coyne, Joan Semmel, Mercedes Matter, Beverly Fishman, Beverly Buchanan, Miriam Schapiro, Elaine de Kooning, and Audrey Flack.

EHCCA's exhibitions included Americanos, a show that focused on Latino artists organized by a guest curator Susana Torruella Leval; Artists Choose Artists, an exhibition that invited established artists to choose younger artists to show alongside them; EHCCA for AIDS Care, a benefit exhibition; Crosscurrents, an exchange exhibition with the Provincetown Fine Arts Work Center; Particular Voices, a show by Robert Giard of photographic portraits of Gay and Lesbian writers; and East Hampton Avant-Garde, a collaborative exhibition with Guild Hall of East Hampton that was a tribute to the Signa Gallery, the artist-run gallery that showed Abstract Expressionism in East Hampton in the 1950s.

EHCCA expanded its mission to include acknowledging artists with distinguished careers by honoring them with solo shows each summer. Peter Busa's New Jazzy Works in 1985 was the first of these shows. In the following years, veteran artists awarded solo shows included William King, Connie Fox and Arnold Mesches. EHCCA also featured works by Mark Rothko, Willem de Kooning, and Alfonso Ossorio.

Adjacent to the storefront space occupied by EHCCA's gallery was an outdoor garden where sculptors were commissioned to create site-specific installations each summer. In 1987 Herb Parker created sod houses arranged around a spiral and lit with neon lights for the space. Patrick Doughtery, Hank de Ricco, Grace Knowlton, and Ron Fondaw were among the others who transformed the garden each summer.

In addition to mounting exhibitions, EHCCA staged special events including premiering performances by Joseph Pintauro; lectures by Joan Jonas, Robert Storr and Eleanor Heartney; and readings by Stanley Moss, Eileen Myles, Kenneth Koch and David Leavitt, among others. EHCCA's programs and exhibitions attracted large crowds of young city people, local families with children, and artists of different generations including old WPA artists and former Max's Kansas City regulars, mixed in with Mudd Club aficionados and young artists who were in residence at the Edward F. Albee Foundation in Montauk.

== Board of advisors ==
Board Advisors to EHCCA included the associate curator at MoMA's Department of Drawings Magdalena Dabrowski, B.H. Friedman, former educational director at Guild Hall Museum, Hope Harris, Bill Jensen, artist, educator and Gallery Director Roy Nicholson, Li-Lan, Susana Torruella Leval, poet, critic, and English instructor at Southampton College Robert Long, Freda Mindlin, Frank Wimberley, and Alfonso Ossorio, who founded and ran the Signa Gallery from 1957 to 1960.

== Closing ==
After the death of Tepper, the EHCCA could not continue its funding, and was forced to close. The EHCCA closed in March, 1991. In 1994 Jennifer Cross went on to become Dean of Art at the Ross School in East Hampton.
