= Front Room Gallery =

Coordinates: 40°42′51.04″N 73°57′27.53″W

The Front Room Gallery is a contemporary art gallery located at 205 Warren Street in Hudson, NY. The directors are Daniel Aycock and Kathleen Vance.

== History ==
Since 1999 The Front Room Gallery has been dedicated to exhibiting artwork for emerging and mid-career artists with a concentration on photography, conceptual art, video, audio art, sculpture, and installation. The Front Room shows works that are at times ephemeral, conceptual or noncommercial in nature and supports a program that includes The Banner Project (public exhibition space) and hosts the multiples and editions program entitled Fuseworks (featured works by national and international artists.)

== Featured artists ==
Stephen Mallon Zoe Wetherall Ken Ragsdale Sasha Bezzubov Phillip Buehler Sean Hemmerle Ashok Sinha Edie Winograde Thomas Broadbent Peggy Cyphers Beth Dary Debra Drexler Amy Hill Mark Masyga Melissa Pokorny Ross Racine Emily Roz Patricia Smith Joanne Ungar
