= Vonage =

American communications company

Vonage Holdings Corp.
- Trade name: Vonage
- Formerly: Min-X.com (1998–2001)
- Type: Subsidiary
- Traded as: Nasdaq: VG
- Industry: Cloud Communications services
- Founded: 1998; 28 years ago (as Min-X); August 24, 2001; 25 years ago (as Vonage) Edison, New Jersey
- Founders: Jeff Pulver; Jeffrey A. Citron
- Headquarters: Holmdel, New Jersey, U.S.
- Area served: Worldwide
- Key people: Christophe Van de Weyer (CEO)
- Products: Unified Communications, Contact Center, Communications APIs, Home VoIP Phone Service Provider
- Services: Business Cloud Communications Services
- Revenue: ▲US$1.41 billion (2021)
- Operating income: ▲US$7.4 million (2021)
- Net income: ▲US$−24 million (2021)
- Total assets: ▼US$1.39 billion (2021)
- Total equity: ▲US$618 million (2021)
- Members: 1.1 million subscribers (2019)
- Number of employees: 2,082 (December 31, 2021)
- Parent: Ericsson
- Website: vonage.com

Vonage Holdings Corp. (/ˈvɒnɪdʒ/, or simply Vonage) is an American cloud communications provider operating as a subsidiary of Ericsson. Headquartered in Holmdel Township, New Jersey, the organization was founded in 1998 as Min-X as a provider of residential telecommunications services based on voice over Internet Protocol (VoIP). In 2001, the organization changed its name to Vonage.

As of 2020, Vonage reported consolidated revenues of $1.25 billion. Through a series of acquisitions beginning in 2013, Vonage, previously a consumer-focused service provider, has expanded its presence in the business-to-business marketplace, while still keeping its home VOIP service. Vonage's offering includes unified communications, contact center applications and communications APIs. In July 2022, Ericsson completed its acquisition of Vonage for $6.2 billion.

== History ==
Vonage logo until 2006

Min-X.com was founded by Jeff Pulver in 1998 as a Voice over IP (VOIP) exchange. He recruited Jeffrey A. Citron and Carlos Bhola, who each invested $1 million and joined as board members. Citron and Bhola then raised approximately $11 million in additional funding, pivoted the company to being a VOIP service provider, and Citron took over as CEO and Bhola as President. The company changed its name to Vonage Holdings Corp. in 2001. When the name was changed the company was located in Edison, New Jersey. In 2005, the organization relocated its headquarters to Holmdel, New Jersey. Pulver left the company in 2002 to start another VOIP venture.

The company first offered subscription service in the United States, then expanded to Canada in 2004 and the United Kingdom in 2005. Vonage went public on May 24, 2006.

=== Initial public offering ===
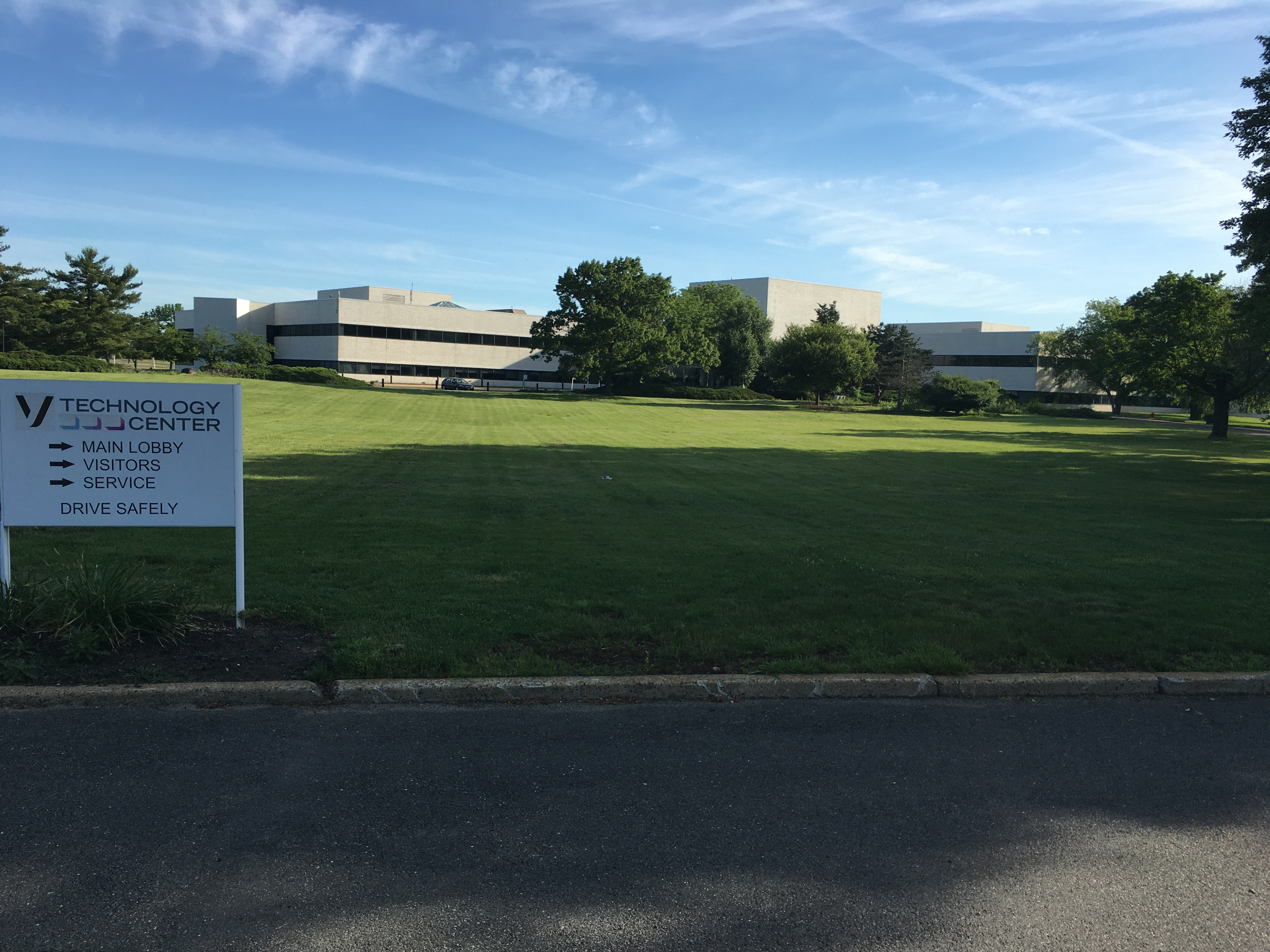
The Vonage building in Holmdel, New Jersey

In 2006, in preparation for an initial public offering, Michael Snyder, former president of ADT Security Services replaced Vonage co-founder Citron as the organization's CEO. Citron could not preside over the IPO because he was permanently barred from associating with any securities brokers or dealers. In 2007, in a restructuring effort to reduce ongoing net losses in the face of double-digit stock price slips and patent infringement issues, Snyder resigned, and Citron returned as interim CEO. The company announced plans for 10% layoffs as it secured $215 million in financing.

Vonage offered shares of its stock to its existing customer base in the period before the initial public offering. Under normal circumstances, only large institutional investors such as banks are able to buy shares of an IPO. Vonage's initial public offering occurred on the New York Stock Exchange on May 24, 2006, opening at $17 per share. The price closed at $14.85, a decrease of 12.7 percent, the worst trading day for any IPO in 2006 up to that point. The IPO raised $531 million for the company. However, the existing customers who lost money filed a class action lawsuit. The IPO and its immediate aftermath also earned Vonage a Business 2.0 Magazine award as 14th of 101 Dumbest Moments in Business for 2006. In 2009, Vonage reached an agreement with the IPO investors. All shareholder claims against Vonage and its individual directors and officers who were named as defendants were dismissed. The amount of the settlement, $3.6 million, was paid by an insurance policy covering the directors and officers of the company.

The firms underwriting the IPO, Citigroup, UBS, and Deutsche Bank, were fined a total of $845,000 and ordered to reimburse customers for "failure to adequately supervise communications" with investors. NYSE regulators went so far as to investigate possible short-selling.

=== Acquisitions ===
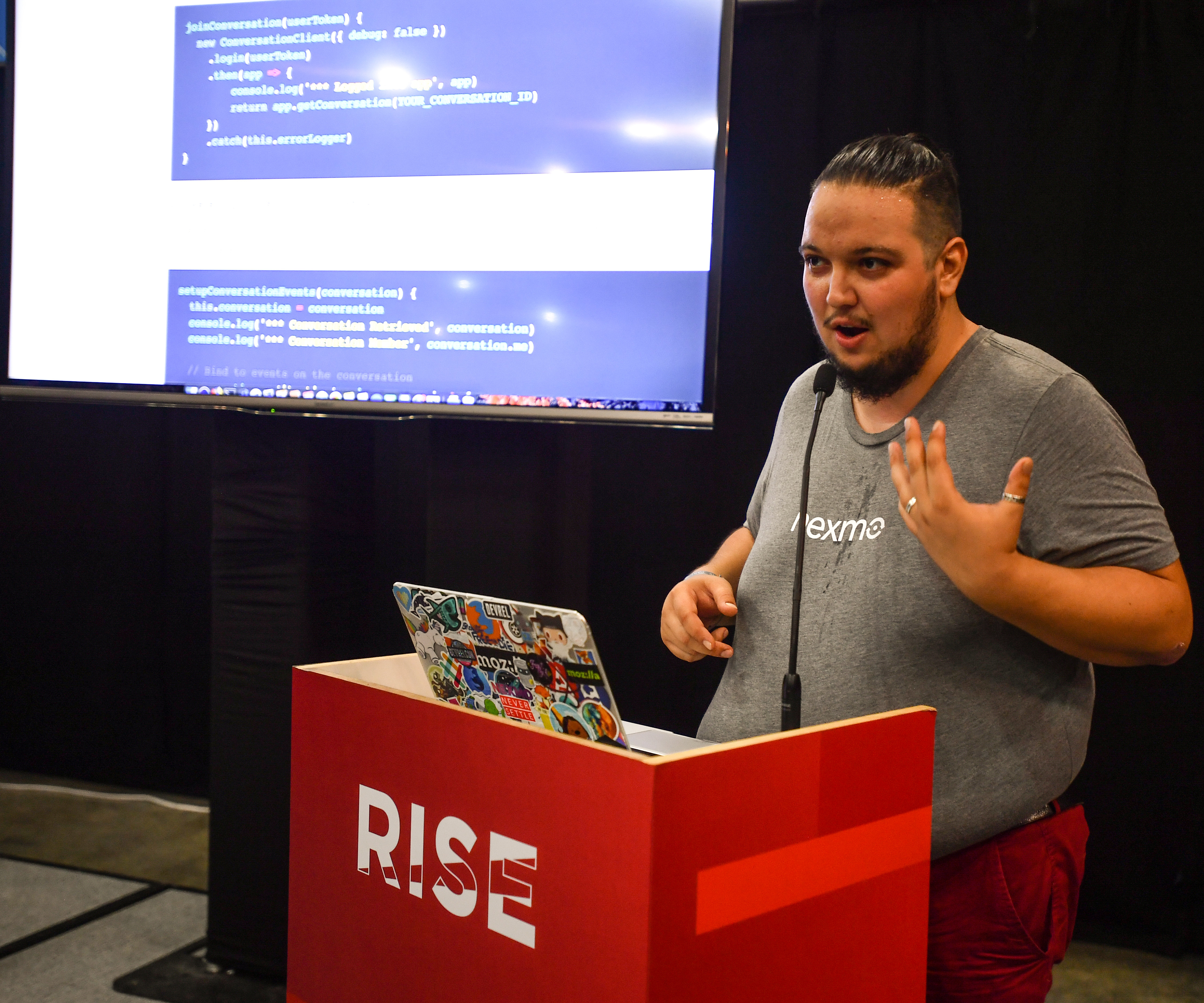
Presentation of Nexmo, an acquisition that became the Vonage API platform, during a 2018 conference

Beginning in 2013, Vonage acquired several companies as it refocused its business from a home phone provider to a global business cloud communications provider, including:

- Vocalocity, a software as a service (SaaS) provider of cloud-based communications services, for $130 million;
- Telesphere, a unified communications as a service (UCaaS) provider to large companies, for $114 million;
- iCore Networks, also a UCSaaS provider to large companies, for $92 million;
- SimpleSignal, another UCSaaS service provider to small and medium-sized businesses, for $25 million;
- gUnify, also a cloud-based communications service provider to businesses (price not disclosed).
- Nexmo, the 2nd largest CPaaS company, for $250 million;
- TokBox, a WebRTC programmable video provider, for $35 million.
- NewVoiceMedia, a Contact Center as a Service (CCaaS) provider, for $350 million
- Over.ai, a Voice and Conversational AI provider for enterprise communications

=== Acquisition by Ericsson ===
On 22 November 2021, it was announced that Vonage would be acquired by Ericsson in a US$6.2 billion all-cash purchase. The acquisition was completed on 21 July 2022. According to the press release, Ericsson acquired all of Vonage's outstanding shares at an all-cash price of US$21 per share, a 28% premium. The acquisition was financed through Ericsson's existing cash resources, which amounted to SEK 88 billion as of 30 September 2021 on a gross basis, and SEK 56 billion on a net basis as of the same date.

Vonage became a wholly owned subsidiary of Ericsson but continues to operate under its existing name and reported as a separate segment in Ericsson accounts. Vonage's employees remained with the company and the Vonage CEO Rory Read joined the Executive Team of Ericsson, reporting to CEO, Börje Ekholm.

In February 2024, Niklas Heuveldop was appointed Head of Business Area Global Communications Platform, a new Business Area within Ericsson, and CEO of Vonage. He was replaced in August 2026 by Christophe Van de Weyer.

== Patent infringement lawsuits ==
On June 19, 2006, Verizon filed a lawsuit alleging that Vonage infringed on five of Verizon's patents related to its VoIP service. The patents describe technology for completing phone calls between VoIP users and people using phones on the traditional public switched network, authenticating VoIP callers, validating VoIP callers' accounts, fraud protection, providing enhanced features, using Wi-Fi handsets with VoIP services, and monitoring VoIP caller usage.

In 2007, Vonage launched a viral marketing campaign and website freetocompete.com, which garnered press coverage about Vonage, its campaign, the lawsuits, and issues of competition with established telecom corporations.

On March 8, 2007, a jury found Vonage liable for infringing three patents held by Verizon, and but found no infringement as to two other patents. The jury returned a verdict against Vonage for $58 million and included a royalty rate of 5.5% of every sale to a Vonage customer to Verizon. Subsequent to this jury award, there were a series of appeals and intermediate stays on payment. Vonage was also ordered by the court to stop signing up new customers, but this was stayed pending appeal three weeks later. On November 19, 2007, Vonage agreed to pay $120 million in damages to Verizon. In other patent lawsuits, by December 2007, Vonage was ordered to pay $80 million to Sprint Nextel and $39 million to AT&T Inc. Another lawsuit with Nortel resulted in no monetary damages.

== 2009 customer service settlement ==
In November 2009, Vonage agreed to an assurance of voluntary compliance (AVC) with 32 states. The settlement followed an investigation into complaints about the marketing of Vonage services, including confusion about availability and cost, along with advertisements involving "free" services, money back guarantees and trial periods. The consumer protection agreement also addressed complaints that some consumers were prevented from canceling the Vonage service. In the settlement, Vonage agreed to pay the seven investigating states $3 million for costs, issue refunds to complainants dating back to January 2004, and change several business practices in regard to advertising and customer retention.

== Services ==
Originally known for its home VOIP services, Vonage has shifted its primary focus to business cloud communications in the mid 2010s. Vonage offers cloud communications and calling plans for residential customers and businesses, including small and medium-sized businesses, mid-market companies, and enterprises.

=== Business services ===
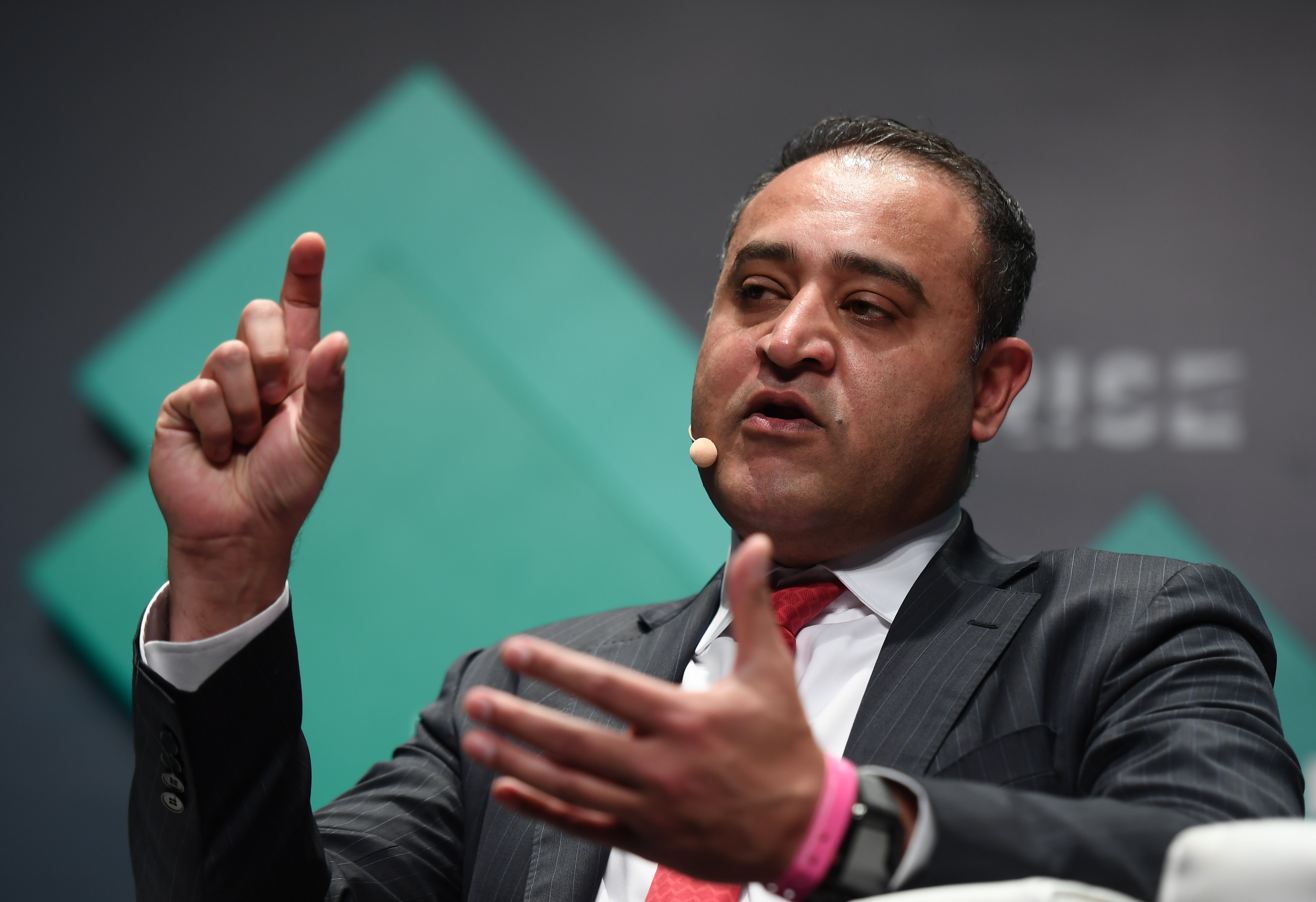
Omar Javaid, CTO of Vonage at the time, speaking at 2018 conference

Vonage offers two unified communications platforms for businesses that integrate communications services, such as video conferencing, voicemail transcription, and desktop sharing, using voice as a platform. Cloud communications services allow business customers to connect with various business applications and customer relationship management (CRM) tools through a middleware technology. For business customers that rely on high quantities of voice, video and data communications in their day-to-day operations, Vonage provides quality of service over its own private Multiprotocol Label Switching (MPLS) network and via a Software Defined Area Network (SD-WAN) product.

=== Residential services ===
Residential services provide home phone plans using VoIP (voice over Internet Protocol) over a broadband Internet connection, such as cable Internet service or DSL. Features for Vonage home phone residential service includes voicemail transcription; 411 calling; caller ID; call waiting; do not disturb; and a network availability feature which forwards all calls to a mobile phone if Internet connectivity is lost. Many of Vonage's residential products offer international calling plans.

=== Service requirements ===
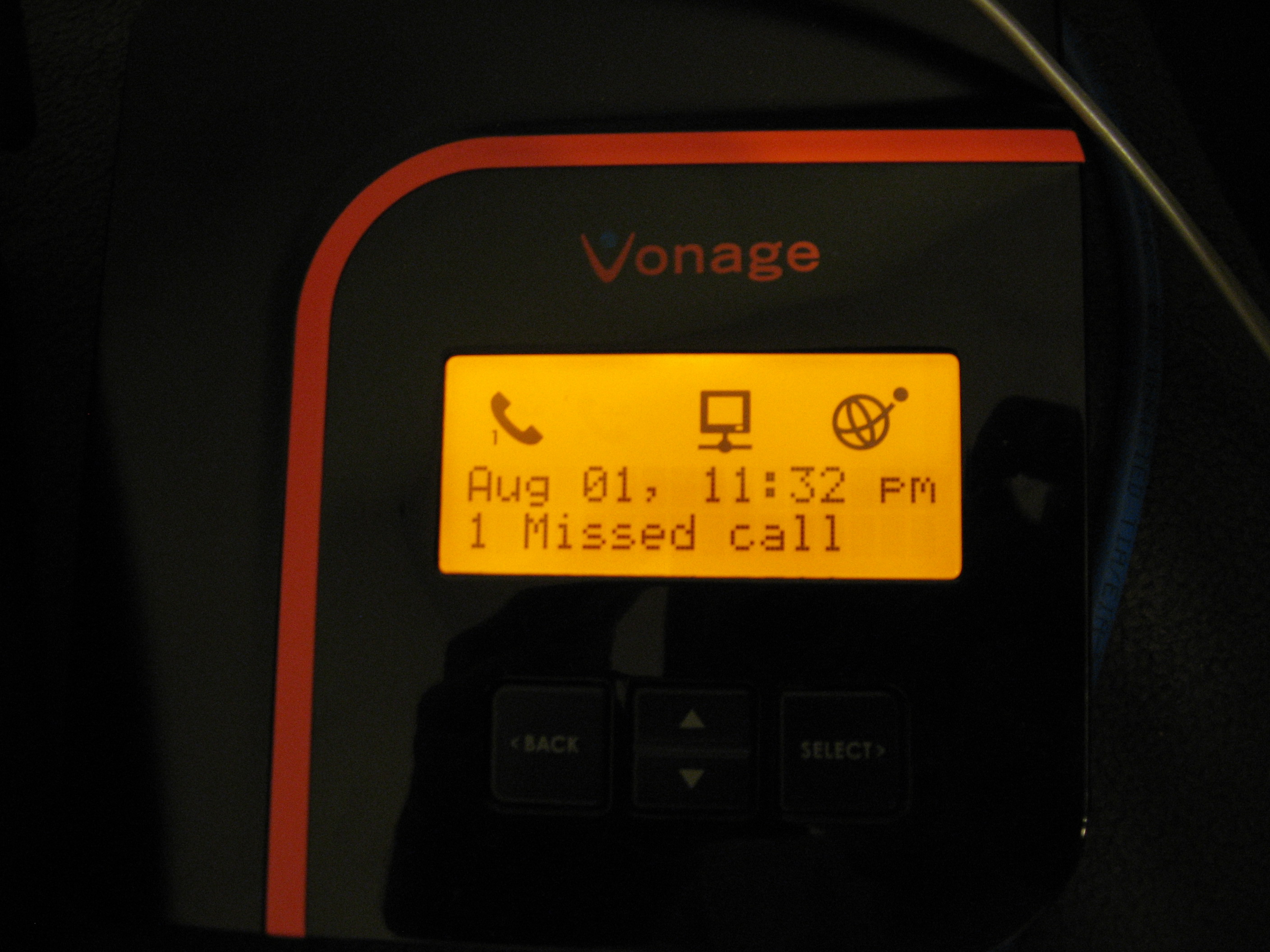
Display on a residential-use Vonage Box phone adapter

Vonage customers must have a broadband Internet connection, such as cable Internet service or DSL, through an Internet service provider (ISP). To initiate subscription a customer must provide a billing and shipping address in the country of service. Vonage supplies an analog telephone adapter which connects a customer supplied standard analog telephone to the Internet and the Vonage service. Residents of the U.S., Canada, and the UK may subscribe to Vonage by credit card from their respective country, but the Vonage adapter can be connected to the Internet anywhere.

Usage is generally referred to as "unlimited", though Vonage has different national "fair use" policies limiting Vonage-to-phone calls to a few thousand minutes per month in the UK, Canada, and U.S. Evidence suggests that calls are limited to a length of 3 hours and 56 minutes.

=== Telephone number availability ===
Subscribers may choose a number in the country of the service they subscribe to for their primary line, in an area code of their choice. Subscribers can obtain additional "virtual numbers" for a monthly fee. Vonage also offers virtual numbers in Mexico, Canada and Europe. While the company supports porting a U.S. telephone number via the FCC's local number portability (LNP), not every phone number is available in every area code. Additionally, customers can transfer an existing number to Vonage, which can take up to 7 to 10 business days from the time the customer completes the Number Transfer Authorization (NTA).

=== Emergency calls ===
Vonage offered 911 service on a VoIP platform for the first time in 2003. For 911 location services to work, subscribers must activate the 911 calling feature by registering their full address with the company. Customers are responsible for maintaining their 911 location information at all times.

If a customer dials 911 before the 911 verification is completed, the call will usually be routed to a national 911 call center where basic information must be given (name, location, nature of emergency, etc.), after which the call is transferred to a local public service answering point, like a local Police Department.

=== Quality of service and equipment compatibility ===
VoIP service relies upon consistent broadband-ISP uptime and VoIP-equipment compatibility with the ISP's modem. Although VoIP was initially optimized for voice, some fax equipment can be operated over VoIP, but compatibility of monitored alarm systems and other devices is less certain. Vonage offers "specially commissioned" Fax Line service. Vonage recommends customers keep a basic traditional landline dedicated to their home alarm system and use Vonage for the rest of their calling needs.

Vonage implements Voice over IP sending audio via RTP and signaling via SIP.

=== Charitable contributions ===
In March 2023, The Vonage Foundation entered into a partnership with Girls Who Code to help provide accessible coding education opportunities to women of all ethnicities and backgrounds by sponsoring its Summer Immersion Program 2023. The program focuses on creating a more diverse workforce in the technology industry by providing virtual classes for high school STEM students for free.

== See also ==
- Kleffman v. Vonage Holdings Corp.
- List of VOIP companies
