= Thomas Brock (opperhoved) =

Thomas Brock (died 23 March 1745) was the second of four Opperhoveds to run the Danish Gold Coast in 1745. He served the shortest period of time, from his arrival on March 11 to his death twelve days later. He would have governed from the then-capital of Fort Christiansborg.

== Sources ==
- https://www.worldstatesmen.org/Ghana.html#Danish
