= Kleffman v. Vonage Holdings Corp. =

- Court: Supreme Court of California
- Full case name: Craig E. KLEFFMAN, Plaintiff and Appellant, v. VONAGE HOLDINGS CORP. et al., Defendants and Appellants.
- Decided: June 21, 2010
- Citation: 232 P.3d 625

Holding
- Question answered

Court membership
- Judges sitting: CHIN, GEORGE, KENNARD, BAXTER, WERDEGAR, MORENO, CORRIGAN

Kleffman v. Vonage Holdings Corp., 232 P.3d 625 (Cal. 2010), is a 2010 Supreme Court of California case certified by United States Court of Appeals for the Ninth Circuit. The decision ruled that sending unsolicited advertisement emails (commonly known as "spam") using multiple domain names was not unlawful under California Business and Professions Code section 17529.5, subdivision (a)(2), which made it unlawful to advertise in a commercial email advertisement that contained or was accompanied by falsified, misrepresented, or forged header information.

== Background ==
In March 2007, plaintiff Craig E. Kleffman filed this class action in California state court against defendants Vonage Holdings Corp., Vonage America, Inc., and Vonage Marketing, Inc. (Vonage), asserting a claim under California Business and Professions Code section 17529.5, subdivision (a)(2) (section 17529(a)(2)), which makes it unlawful to advertise in a commercial email if the advertisement contains or is accompanied by falsified, misrepresented, or forged header information. The plaintiff received 11 unsolicited email advertisements. Although they were able to be tracked back to a Vonage's marketing agent, each email contained a different domain name, from which people cannot tell it was sent from Vonage. According to Kleffman, Vonage's use of these multiple domain names reduced the likelihood that emails were filtered out as spam. Kleffman asserted that Vonage's use of multiple domain names to bypass spam filters, its failure to use a single domain name in sending its advertisements, and its failure to identify Vonage in the domain name from which the advertisements were sent constituted falsified and misrepresented header information prohibited by section 17529.5(a)(2).

Vonage removed the case to federal court and moved to dismiss the complaint. In May 2007, United States District Court for the Central District of California dismissed the action. The court ruled that the claim failed under the plain language of section 17529.5(a)(2).

Kleffman appealed to the United States Court of Appeals for the Ninth Circuit. The Ninth Circuit asked the Supreme Court of California the following question: Does sending unsolicited commercial email advertisements from multiple domain names for the purpose of bypassing spam filters constitute falsified, misrepresented, or forged header information under section 17529.5(a)(2)?

The Supreme Court of California granted the Ninth Circuit's request.

== Defendant's argument ==
Vonage argued that header information was not "misrepresented" within the meaning of section 17529.5(a)(2) unless it contained "a false representation of fact" because it was the established definition of the term "misrepresent" according to the tort of misrepresentation. Thus, according to Vonage, their email advertisements, whose header information was fully accurate and traceable, did not violate section 17529.5(a)(2).

== Plaintiff's argument ==
Kleffman argued "misrepresented" header information must encompass something in addition to a false statement of fact because section 17529.5(a)(2) already prohibited "falsified" header information. Then, referring to other statutory provisions in the false advertising sections of the Business and Professions Code that prohibited false or misleading advertising, he asserted that the court should construe the term "misrepresent" to give a "misleading" representation or idea. He stated that this construction fitted in the dictionary meaning of the term "misrepresent" and complied with the legislative history. By constructing this way, according to Kleffman, sending of email ads with random, varied, garbled and nonsensical nature of the multiple domain names could violate section 17529.5(a)(2) because it created the misleading impression that these ads were from different entities.

== Court opinion ==
The court agreed with the defendant's opinion and held that sending commercial email advertisements from multiple domain names for the purpose of bypassing spam filters is not unlawful under section 17529.5(a)(2). More specifically, the court found that a single email with an accurate and traceable domain name neither contains nor was accompanied by misrepresented header information within the meaning of section 17529.5(a)(2) merely because its domain name was random, varied, garbled, and nonsensical. According to the court, absent a misrepresentation of header information, using a given domain name could not violate section 17529.5(a)(2) even if the sender intended to bypass the spam filters. The reasoning was as follows:

- Plain meaning of the statutory language

Kleffman tried to construct the section 17529.5(a)(2) by defining the term misrepresent as giving a misleading representation or idea. Pertaining to this construction, the court pointed out that the Business and Professions Code used each of the terms of "misrepresent" and "mislead" in expressing a different meaning; thus defining the term "misrepresent" by the term "mislead" was contradictory even though some lay dictionaries did that.

Kleffman also asserted that the relevant legislative history supported his construction by relying on a legislative analysis of a subsequent bill that amended section 17529.5(a)(2) in 2004. This legislative analysis stated that the federal CAN-SPAM Act did not preempt the right of action under State law against those who send spam "with misleading or falsified headers." The court, however, denied this position by stating that the analysis just ensured the private right of action under State law against spammers who use falsified headers and Kleffman overstated the significance of the imprecise and summary language in the isolated statement. Furthermore, the court found that the legislative history of the 2004 amendment rather reflected a careful and purposeful distinction between the terms "misrepresented" and "misleading."

- Legislature's intention and federal preemption

The court stated that the Legislature did not intend section 17529.5(a)(2) generally to prohibit the use of multiple domain names because it addressed the subject of multiple domain names by passing another section.

The court also pointed out that the Legislature did not intend section 17529(a)(2) to make it unlawful to use a domain name that did not identify the sender. According to the court, use of a domain name that did not identify the sender was not capable of misrepresenting the sender because it did not represent any sender from the beginning. Moreover, court emphasized that the constructing section 17529.5(a)(2) as requiring sender information would bring about significant preemption problems because federal CAN-SPAM Act preempted a State law requiring commercial email to carry specific types of labels, or to follow a certain format or contain specified content.

- Uncertainty of the rule

Kleffman argued that if domain names of commercial email ads were "random", "varied", "garbled" and "nonsensical," sending of such email ads violated section 17529.5(a)(2). The court pointed out that this construction was especially problematic given that a violation of section 17529.5(a)(2) was punishable by imprisonment for up to six months because what these words meant was uncertain.

- Concern about spam filters' effectiveness

Kleffman argued the legislative history of section 17529.5(a)(2) showed Legislature's concern about limitation of spam filters. The court, however, found that references made by Kleffman to illustrate this did not have enough weight to be considered.

== Criticism against opt-out regulation ==
The U.S. CAN-SPAM Act has "opt-out" regulation that allows sending commercial email without prior consent from the recipient. While on the other hand, many countries other than U.S. have introduced "opt-in" regulation that prohibits sending commercial email without obtaining prior permission from the recipient.

Sending of email ads using multiple domain names is lawful under the ruling of the Kleffman v. Vonage holdings Corp., even if aimed at avoiding spam filters. If opt-in regulation in sending commercial email were introduced, however, this kind of email-ads sending would become unlawful. For this reason, there is a criticism that the CAN-SPAM Act leaves its loop holes.
