= Barbara Takenaga =

American painter

- Born: Barbara Takenaga; 1949 (age 76–77); North Platte, Nebraska, United States
- Education: University of Colorado Boulder
- Known for: Painting, printmaking
- Style: Abstract
- Awards: Guggenheim Fellowship, National Academy of Art, American Academy of Arts and Letters
- Website: barbaratakenaga.com

Barbara Takenaga (born 1949) is an American artist known for swirling, abstract paintings that have been described as psychedelic and cosmic, as well as scientific, due to their highly detailed, obsessive patterning. She gained wide recognition in the 2000s, as critics such as David Cohen and Kenneth Baker placed her among a leading edge of artists renewing abstraction with paintings that emphasized visual beauty and excess, meticulous technique, and optical effects. Her work suggests possibilities that range from imagined landscapes and aerial maps to astronomical and meteorological phenomena to microscopic views of cells, aquatic creatures or mineral cross-sections. In a 2018 review, The New Yorker described Takenaga as "an abstractionist with a mystic’s interest in how the ecstatic can emerge from the laborious."

Barbara Takenaga, Forte, acrylic on linen, 54 in × 135 in (1,400 mm × 3,400 mm), 2011. Courtesy DC Moore Gallery, New York.

Takenaga has had solo exhibitions at the MASS MoCA Hunter Center, Huntington Museum of Art, Neuberger Museum of Art Space 42, and Art in General, and a twenty-year survey at Williams College Museum of Art in 2017. She has participated in group shows at the Frist Art Museum, Bemis Center for Contemporary Arts, Pennsylvania Academy of Fine Arts, deCordova Museum, and San Jose Museum of Art, among others. In 2020, she received a Guggenheim Fellowship, and she has been recognized by the National Academy of Design and American Academy of Arts and Letters. Takenaga lives and works in New York City and is the Mary A. & William Wirt Warren Professor of Art, Emerita at Williams College.

== Mature work and critical reception ==
Writers characterize Takenaga as an abstract painter despite the illusionistic and suggestive qualities of her art, noting that the work emerges from imagination, reflection and an intuitive process combining chance, order and repetitive labor, rather than from observation. She often begins with splashy, faux-Abstract Expressionist grounds, before methodically but intuitively applying hand-painted forms to create patterns; the process is informed by her early printmaking background and employs a flat, graphic approach that includes tracing, transferring, outlining, and pooling paint.

Barbara Takenaga, Gold + Red, acrylic on wood panel, 42 in × 36 in (1,070 mm × 910 mm), 2005. Collection of the Pennsylvania Academy of Fine Art.

Takenaga's diverse influences include Tantric mandalas, the woodblock prints of Utagawa Kuniyoshi, Japanese-Pop graphic artist Tadanori Yokoo, Sol LeWitt, Roger Brown, and the Pattern and Decoration movement. Writers such as John Yau and Debra Bricker Balken ascribe her emphasis on decoration and detail, spatial ambiguity, and visceral, optical qualities to her interests in the ecstatic, pleasurable qualities of non-Western and Op art, each of which offered alternatives to Abstract Expressionism's self-expressive existential angst and Minimalism's flat, reductive self-referentiality. Formally, Takenaga engages opposing elements of surface and depth, flatness and dimension, stasis and movement. In conceptual terms, critics identify persistent (if submerged) themes in her work involving personal history, wonder and dread, mourning and mortality, along with a sense of levity that she has called "earnest goofiness."

=== Painting (2001–09) ===
In the early 2000s, Takenaga committed to abstraction, working modestly scaled variations on a set format: centripetal or centrifugal patterns that radiate or coil from a slightly off-center focal point, forming all-over fields that evoke nocturnal skies and celestial forms (e.g., Night Painting, 2001). New York Times critic Ken Johnson described these paintings as "optically riveting and transcendentally suggestive [of] a swarming, spacey feeling like traveling at the speed of light through a galaxy or a psychic center of illumination." Her late-2001 work was created in the shadow of grief following the death of her mother; she immortalized the memory of both her parents in the ethereal works Shizue and Toshiwo—bright, radiating constellations of concentric dots and spirals on nebulous blue fields that convey both mortality and visual euphoria.

Barbara Takenaga, Ozma, acrylic on linen, 70 in × 60 in (1,800 mm × 1,500 mm), 2009.

Critics such as Art in America 's Robert Kushner identified an expansion of Takenaga's vocabulary in shows at McKenzie Fine Art (2003, 2005), which yielded surprising, more dynamic arrangements within her tight self-imposed parameters. Feathery swirls in Wave (2002) suggest studies of ornate, autonomous systems evoking both decorative cross-cultural and scientific imagery; later works resemble vibrant cellular or bubble forms (Rubazu), bulbous spiraled microorganisms (Tarazed #1), and jeweled mandala or Paisley patterns (Gold + Red). In subsequent work, she explored subdued palettes evoking loss—grays, white, black, pale greens and turquoises, and metallic golds and silvers—and forms suggesting ambiguous, otherworldly environs (Ghost Triptych 2007–8), molecular frameworks or the suction-cup undersides of sea stars and octopuses (Ozma, 2009), and bent, skewed grids and lattices like three-dimensional, topographic maps of black holes that approach Op art, such as Angel (pink) (2008) and Zardo (2009).

=== Post-2009 painting ===
In 2010, Takenaga made two significant shifts in her work: she began incorporating a flat, linear element serving as both horizon and spatial division, and she relinquished some control, allowing chance elements and looser patterns (still dot swirls, undulating constellations and bursting whorls) to emerge in bolder compositions. Critics suggest the horizon line—normally a stabilizing element—disrupted her typically ordered work, allowing a wider pictorial range to evolve that alluded to imaginary landscape and aquatic as well as galactic realms.

The shifts first appeared in paintings that drew on Takenaga's midwestern upbringing. The largely gray and blue Nebraska Painting EL1 (2010) and Whiteout (2011) suggest limitless winter fields vanishing into big skies, while the more colorful Sparkler (Red Line) (2010) and Red Funnel (2013) allude to fireworks, carnival lights and tornadoes. She renewed her interest in ambitiously scaled, horizontal work in the panoramic triptychs Rise/Fall and Forte (2011), Diptych (Ikat) (2012), and later, Nebraska (2015, MASS MoCA), a 110-foot mural that repeated a dizzying, hand-painted wallpaper pattern reminiscent of a snowy, furrowed field under a distant blue sky. John Yau identifies a dissonance and instability he likens to dissimilar systems invading each other's territory in this work (e.g., Ronin, 2011). He attributes this to her looser approach and use of unearthly metallic paints (which change with the angle of the light), noting a collective, disquieting effect he interprets as acknowledgement of an indifferent universe. Art in America's Carol Diehl, however, discerns a sense of order beyond the easily comprehensible in the work's suspension between visual excess and rigor; she compares its mystical quality to van Gogh's The Starry Night.

In her later work, Takenaga has admitted more open space and exposed the drips, puddles, and spatters of her modulated underpaintings as a compositional element (e.g., the lantern-like Green Light, 2013). She has also continued to expand her associative range to include northern lights, meteor showers (Night Painting (JFM), 2016), geodes and fractals, in work that Ken Johnson describes as viewed more "through the ecstatic, possibly pharmaceutically aided perceptions of a hippie dreamer" than "the technologically assisted eyes of a scientist."

Barbara Takenaga, Manifold 5, acrylic on linen, 70 in × 225 in (1,800 mm × 5,700 mm), 2018.

Takenaga's paintings in the shows "Outset" (2018) and "Manifold" (2019) at DC Moore Gallery employ austere, contemplative palettes (black, iridescent white, silvery gray and blue) and bolder, shifting figure-ground relationships featuring large, dark shapes like holes in the images (e.g., Aeaea; Hello). Their mysterious forms draw widely—on classical Japanese art, scientific imagery and mid-century abstraction—and leave behind her fields, tarmacs and horizon lines for more confrontational, turbulent references to explosions, space travel, drifting land masses, and microbiology, evoking a world of constant pressure and relentless change. Works such as the sprawling, five-panel Manifold 5 use abstracted silhouette imagery (a river, clouds, robes, elephants, votive candles, geyser forms) taken from Japanese screens and other Eastern sources; they function as patterns or dark grounds flipping between positive shapes and negative space. The contrasting Serrulata (in translation, cherry tree) layers and presses together multiple processes—patterns, pours, Sumi ink-like splotches, and drips of dark blue, black and gray—creating patterns on a shell pink ground to suggest cherry blossoms and themes of disruption, dispersal, decay and transience.

== Early biography and career ==
Takenaga was born in North Platte, Nebraska in 1949. She earned a BFA (Art and English, 1972) and MFA (1978) from University of Colorado Boulder. Her graduate studies focused on printmaking and took place against a backdrop of 1970s post-psychedelic consciousness raising, interest in the Eastern thought and second-wave feminism; they culminated in a 52-foot, gridded mural-installation, Here to Here, Sense and Nonsense (1978), composed of several dozen abstract-patterned lithographs.

After receiving her MFA, Takenaga taught at Washington University in St. Louis and University of Denver, before moving to New York City and joining the faculty of Williams College in Massachusetts in 1985. During this time, she produced large-scale installations combining elements like rocks and cut and patterned paper that alluded to Zen raked gardens; their balance of asymmetrical elements, spatial ambiguity, black graphic markmaking, and subtle color explored the role of Japanese-American cultural identity in her art. Takenaga presented in solo exhibitions at A.I.R. Gallery and Art in General, and in group shows at the Boston Center for the Arts, Asian American Arts Centre and Asian Art Museum (San Francisco), among others.

In the 1990s, Takenaga turned to enormous (often twenty-foot-long) acrylic paintings constructed from hollow wooden doors, which used enigmatic abstract shapes and symbols drawn from science, logic and classical Eastern art. The Long Resonance (1991) is a representative work; it features a cloud-like expanse breaking into a dark, rectangular ground decorated with icons, silhouettes (animals or Japanese figures) and garlands of red, dotted lines that presage her future paintings. In subsequent work, she dramatically reduced her scale to intimate (12 in × 9 in (300 mm × 230 mm)) abstractions eliminating signage and recognizable elements. Nevus (1997) and Tortuca (1998) employ whimsical, intricate spirals overlaid on modulated grounds of beige and brown. Inspired by an offhand observation of spiraling tufts of hair on her dog, these forms evolved into Takenaga's mature work when she began painting variations on darkened backgrounds, evoking celestial phenomena.

In the early 2000s, Takenaga exhibited at institutions including McKinney Avenue Contemporary, the CU Art Museum (both solo), the Tang Teaching Museum, and Museum of Contemporary Art Denver, among others.

== Recognition and public collections ==
Takenaga has received a Guggenheim Fellowship (2020), been elected an academician of the National Academy of Design (2013), and been recognized with awards from the For-Site Foundation, National Academy Museum, American Academy of Arts & Letters, New England Foundation for the Arts and New York State Council on the Arts; she has received residencies from the Space Program of the Marie Walsh Sharpe Art Foundation, Smith College printmaking workshop, and Dieu Donne Papermill.

Her work is represented in the permanent collections of the Library of Congress, Frederick R. Weisman Art Foundation, Crocker Art Museum, Ackland Art Museum, Arkansas Art Center, deCordova Museum, Henry Art Gallery, Museum of Outdoor Arts, Museum of Nebraska Art, New Jersey State Museum, Neuberger Museum of Art, Pennsylvania Academy of Fine Art, San Jose Museum of Art, Sheldon Museum of Art, Tang Teaching Museum, and United States Embassy, as well as many college, university and corporate collections. She has exhibited at DC Moore Gallery (New York, since 2009), Gregory Lind Gallery (San Francisco, 2003–19) and Robischon Gallery (Denver), and her print publishers include Shark’s Ink (Colorado) and Wingate Studios (New Hampshire).
