= Christian Schiønning =

Governor of Danish Gold Coast

Christian Schiønning (died 1 March 1817) was a governor of the Danish Gold Coast, a Danish Crown Colony. He governed from the colony's capital, Fort Christiansborg, from 15 April 1807 to 1 March 1817.

== Schiønning as governor ==
In 1811, during his term as governor, Schiønning was forced to pay a ransom of one hundred ounces of gold to the Empire of Ashanti for the release of the commandant of Fort Konigenstein, the Danish fort at Ada, who had helped Know Saffatchi, king of the Akwapim, escape from the army of Apoko, an Ashanti general under Asantehene Osei Bonsu.
