= Elise Crull =

American philosopher

Elise Marie Crull (born 1982) is an associate professor of physics at the City College of New York. She lists her research interests as the philosophy of physics, history of science, metaphysics, and the relationship between science and religion. Her work has focused on the use of quantum decoherence to explain philosophical puzzles in physics.

== Education and career ==
Crull majored in physics at Calvin University, where she received a bachelor's degree in 2005. She continued her studies as a philosophy student at the University of Notre Dame, where she received a master's degree in 2008 and completed her Ph.D. in 2011. Her doctoral dissertation, Quantum Decoherence and Interlevel Relations, was directed by Don Howard.

After postdoctoral research at the University of Aberdeen in Scotland from 2011 to 2013, and the Hebrew University of Jerusalem from 2013 to 2014, she became an assistant professor of philosophy at the City College of New York in 2014. She was promoted to associate professor in 2021.

== Books ==
Crull is coauthor, with Guido Bacciagaluppi, of the book The Einstein Paradox: The Debate on Nonlocality and Incompleteness in 1935. She is co-editor, with Guido Bacciagaluppi, of the book Grete Hermann: Between Physics and Philosophy, on German mathematician and philosopher Grete Hermann.

== Recognition ==
Crull was named a Fellow of the American Physical Society (APS) in 2025, after a nomination from the APS Forum on the History and Philosophy of Physics, "for outstanding historical research, including the expansion of the historical record pertaining to the EPR paradox and revealing new commentary between 1927 and 1935, especially the contributions of Grete Hermann, and for leadership of the Women in the History of Quantum Physics working group".
