= Christian Tychsen =

Danish governor (died 1768)

Christian Tychsen was the first head of the Danish Gold Coast to be given the title of Governor on a regular basis. Prior to his governorship, only Bartholomaus von Gronstein, Conrad Crull, and Magnus Prang had served as governors. He served as governor from 20 October 1766 until his death in 1768, governing from the capital of the colony, Fort Christiansborg.

Before Christian Tychsen, three Danes had been designated as commander. While Peter With (1677–1681) was Opperhoved in Friedensborg, Johann Ulrich served as commander at Fort Christiansborg (1677 to 1679); he was succeeded by Peter Boldt whose commandership lasted from 1679 to 1681 when Magnus Prang became governor. The last commander was Lieutenant Lykke.
