= Central Park Bandstand =

- Music Pavilion
- U.S. National Register of Historic Places
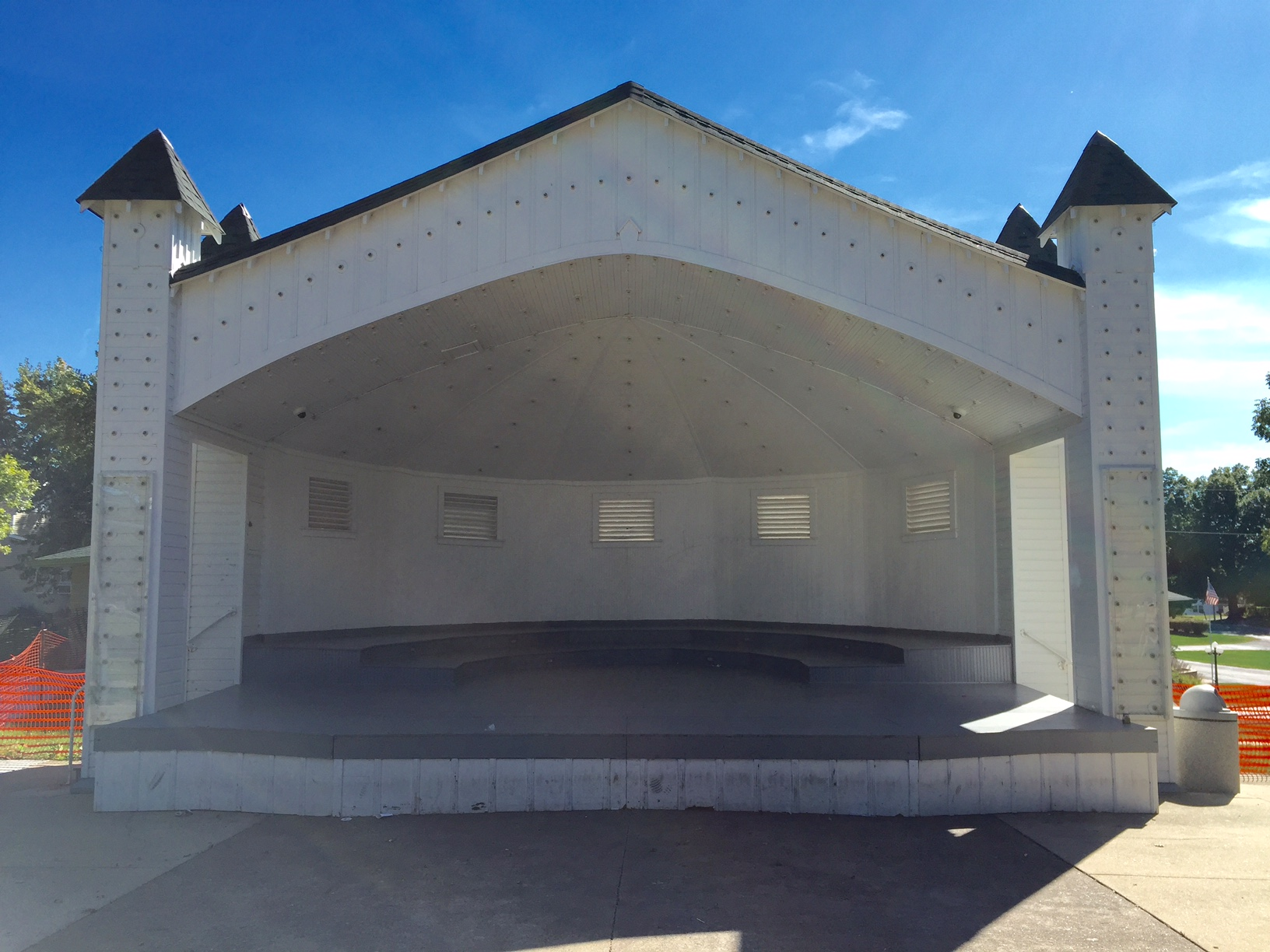

- Location within Illinois Location within the United States
- Location: 1208 5th St. Orion, Illinois
- Coordinates: 41°21′13″N 90°22′51″W
- Area: less than one acre
- Built: 1913
- Built by: J. C. Ericson
- NRHP reference No.: 02000544
- Added to NRHP: May 22, 2002

The Central Park Bandstand, also known as the Music Pavilion, is a historic bandshell located within Central Park in Orion, Illinois. The bandstand was built in 1913 following a series of successful outdoor concerts in the park. Local engineer J. C. Ericson built the structure in the then-recently popularized bandshell form, which projected sound toward the audience through its rear wall. The bandstand was completed in three weeks; its opening concert hosted the largest crowd that the park had ever held until that time. From its inception until 1925, the bandstand continued to host concerts, usually once per week; movie screenings and church services were also held at the bandstand. Beginning in 1947, the bandstand became an event stage for the Midwest Corn Show, which later became the Orion Fall Festival; the structure is now mainly used during the festival.

The bandstand was added to the National Register of Historic Places on May 22, 2002.
