= Conrad Crull =

Conrad Crull was the second governor of the Danish Gold Coast from 1674 to 1677. He governed the Danish Gold Coast from Fort Friedensburg (Frederiksborg).

Originally, Karlsborg (Carolusburg) was where the Danish chief administrator was located. This had initially been in Swedish hands and reverted to Sweden by 15 April 1659. It subsequently became Dutch on 2 May 1663. Any Swedish designs on it were abandoned with the Treaty of Breda concluded on 21 July 1667. Prior to that, the Danes had made Fort Friedensborg the administrative center of their Gold Coast possessions. Fort Christiansborg became the capital of Danish West Africa after the English invaded Friedensborg as the means for collecting the Danish commander (Lieutenant Lykke)'s gambling debts.

Prior to Crull, Bartholomaus von Gronstein had been designated Governor. The title of governor was not given on a regular basis. Only Magnus Prang would be given that designation again in 1681. Normally, the chief administrator of the Danish Gold Coast was titled Opperhoved. It was only with Christian Tychsen, who was appointed in 1766, that the title of governor was given with regularity thereafter.
