= Ford Crull =

American painter

Ford Crull (born June 6, 1954) is an American Neosymbolist abstract artist.

Crull was born on June 6, 1954, in Boston, Massachusetts. He lived in Seattle until 1976, after which he moved to Los Angeles to embark on his professional career. While still an art student at the University of Washington, he won many prizes at local arts festivals, and was the youngest ever artist to be invited to show at the Northwest Art Annual. Considered a precocious talent, Crull joined Foster White Gallery, one of Seattle's premier at galleries where he had several exhibitions before graduating university.

From 1976 to 1983 Crull's paintings focused on organic, biomorphic shapes on white backgrounds, a gestational period for the artist that expressed in a pure abstract manner with impasto like surfaces. He joined the Stella Polaris Gallery in 1983, where he met art critic and writer Edward Goldman, and host of KCRW's “Art Talk.” Goldman championed Crull's works, which were acquired by corporate art collections, and was also instrumental in Crull's first significant non-gallery show at the USC Fisher Museum of Art (then, the Fisher Gallery) at the University of Southern California.

In 1983 Crull relocated to New York City, and became a seminal figure in the East Village art scene. He was discovered by Colin de Land, founder of Vox Populi, and the Armory Art Show. Crull had several shows at the Vox Populi, a time marked also by commercial success, and national recognition for the artist. Crull's works were acquired by the Metropolitan Museum of Art, the Brooklyn Museum, the National Gallery of Art, and the Dayton Art Institute.

In 1989, Crull was part of the very first showing of American artists in the USSR, Painting Beyond the Death of Painting at the Kuznetsky Most Exhibition Hall in Moscow curated by American art critic and historian, Donald Kuspit. This coincided with the time Crull was influenced by the Philosophy of Dualism. Upon his return from Russia, Crull began using steel framing for his paintings, with the edges burned. It was an invention that came to him after seeing the ancient icons in Russia. The new works were titled, “Relic Series”.

In a 1994 interview on the artist's work at Howard Scott Gallery in NYC noted art critic Eleanor Heartney stated,"The key to Crull’s vision is his simultaneous embrace of the uncertainties of the contemporary world and his affirmation of the reality of the individual consciousness within it. In his work, the authentic self remains the last bulwark against an anarchic world."

From 2006–2010, Crull made several visits to Shanghai, China, culminating in the first of his subsequent interdisciplinary live art works. At the opening of the Bund 1919 art bank, a cultural and art enclave developed from five 1919 buildings at Shanghai No. 8 Cotton and Textile Factory, Crull executed a public art project to a live performance of pianist Shi Wen.
