= Keta =

Coastal town in Ghana

Keta Ketta, Quittah
- Town & Municipality Capital
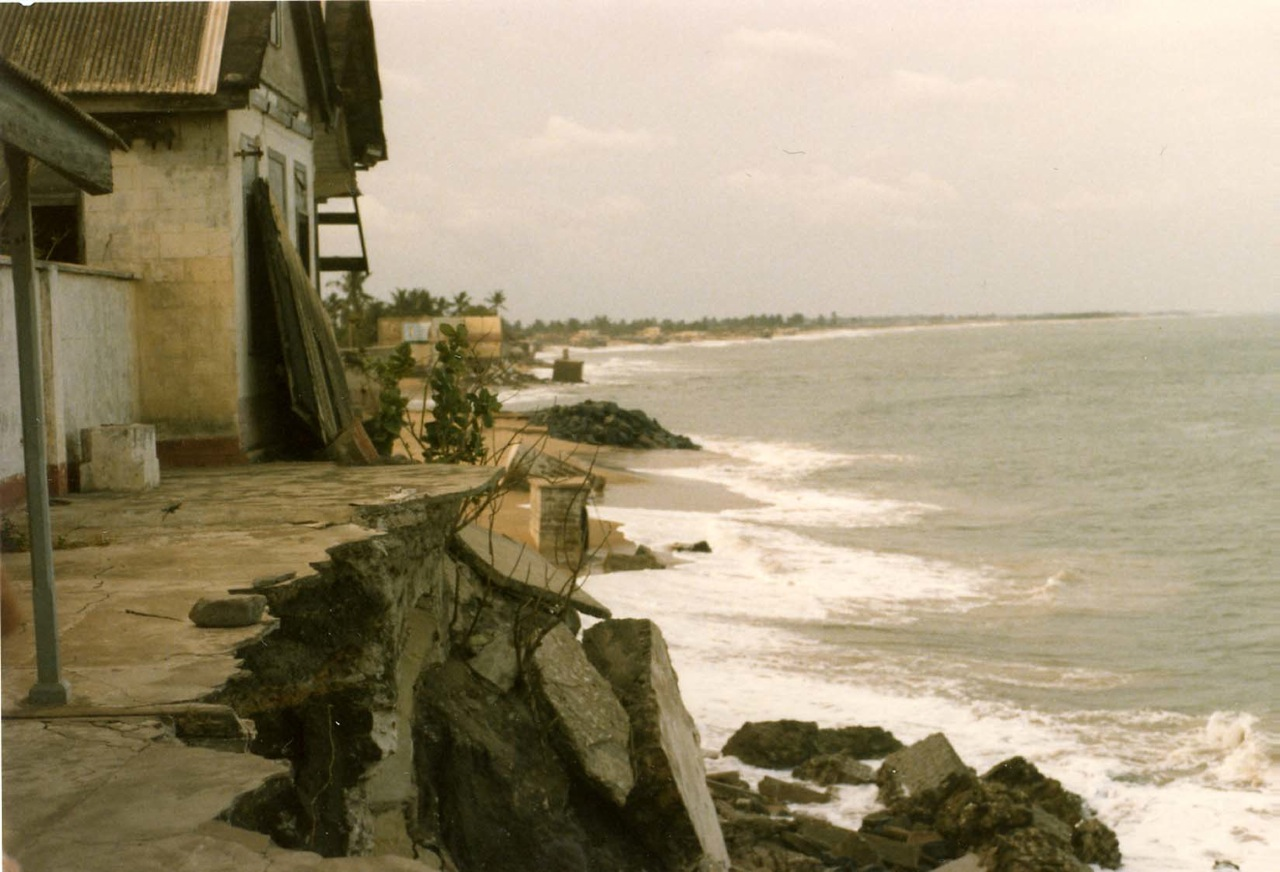
- Fort Prizenstein on the beach of Keta in 1985

- Location of Keta in Volta
- Coordinates: 5°55′N 0°59′E
- Country: Ghana
- Region: Volta Region
- District: Keta Municipal District

Population (2013)
  - Total: 23,207
  - Density: 1,829/sq mi (706/km^{2})
- Ranked 61st in Ghana
- Time zone: GMT
  - Summer (DST): GMT
- Area code: +233 (3626)

Keta is a coastal town and the capital of the Keta Municipal District in the Volta Region of Ghana.

Keta has a population of 23,207.

== History ==
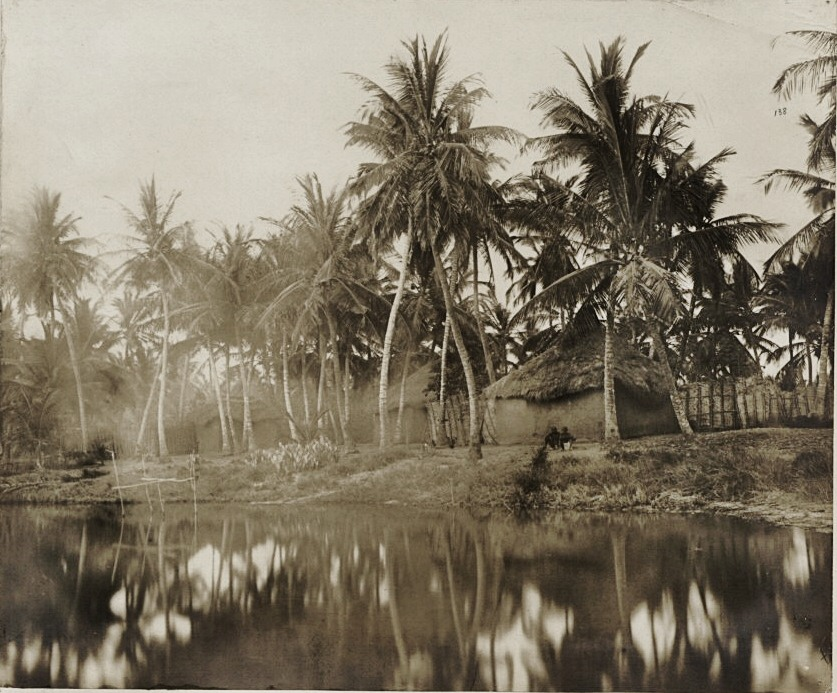
Village on the Keta Lagoon, near Keta, 1890s

Keta was an important trading post between the 14th and the late 20th centuries. The Somey Ewes were the original people of the Keta area. Keta was settled by the Anlo Ewe, a sub-group of the Ewe people who, in the 17th century, migrated to the area from Ketu, in Benin via Adja Tado and Notsie in Togo. Awanyedor and Akaga, who were sons of Torgbui Wenya - the founder of the Anlo State, left Anloga to found Keta as a fishing village.

The town attracted the interest of the Danish, because they felt they could establish a base here without interference from rival European nations. Their first initiative was to place a factory at Keta to sell alcohol. Following the Anlo-Danish War (the Sagbadre War of 1784), the Danes later built a fort in Keta (Fort Prizenstein = "Prince’s Stone Fort"). That enabled Keta to flourish in commerce. However, the Danes' efforts to exert any power beyond the range of the guns located in the fort proved to be ineffective.

In June 1790, a Danish official was killed at Agorko near Denu in retaliation for him killing the chief of Keta years earlier. Lacking any effective military forces, the Danes hired the Anloga people to punish the Keta people. Initially, Anloga and Keta agreed to stage a mock battle after which the Anloga would burn a few Keta houses and then share the money provided by the Danes. But the mock fight somehow turned into a real battle, leaving a legacy of enmity between Anloga and Keta. The civil war between Keta and Anloga in the year 1794, initiated by the Danes, culminated in the defeat of Keta. This substantially weakened the Anlo people.

Faced with the threat of war between Peki and an alliance of the Ashanti and the Akwamu, the North German Missionary Society (also known as the Bremen Missionaries) moved the focus of their activities from Peki to Keta. Their missionaries, Dauble and Plessing, landed at nearby Dzelukofe on September 2, 1853.

Historically Keta was also known as Quittah or Agudzeawo ("Easterners" in old Ewe) and was assigned B27 as a postal mark.

From 1874 Hausa Constabulary were based at Keta, and soon there grew to be a community of Hausa traders in the town. The author, and then colonial Civil Servant, R. Austin Freeman served as a medical officer (Assistant Surgeon) here in 1887 during which an epidemic of black water fever killed forty per cent of the European population.

In 1917, the first Orange Lodge in Ghana was founded. It was named "Pride of Keta, LOL 891". It was founded by R. E. Sharlley, a Ghanaian postal worker who learned about Orangeism during the First World War and contacted the Grand Orange Lodge in England for affiliation. Sharlley’s initiative led to the formation of the lodge under the authority of the Orange Order, marking the beginning of organised Orangeism in Ghana.

The lodge played a key role in the early spread of the Orange Order across Ghana, contributing to the formation of additional lodges and ultimately the establishment of a national governing body, the Grand Lodge of Ghana, in 1918. Ghana’s Orange lodges, including Pride of Keta, traditionally drew membership from educated Christian communities and maintained the Order’s fraternal practices while adapting to local cultural contexts.

== Ecology ==
In 1784, Fort Prinzenstein, like most slave trade forts, was built by the sea's edge. The sea had retreated by about 600ft by 1907. Since then, Keta has been subject to tidal waves, perennial flooding and sustained sea erosion. The Bremen Factory and Coconut plantation, which were close to the high water mark in 1907, had been swept away by the sea by 1924. The erosion has advanced as far as Queen Street and started to wear away the Fort.

Close to Keta is the town of Woe, known for the Cape St. Paul Lighthouse on the beach that is believed to guide ships away from a mythical massive underwater mountain. This lighthouse is also thought to be the oldest in Ghana.

In July 2026, technical teams from the Volta River Authority opened the Havedzi floodgate to allow water from the Keta Lagoon to flow into the Atlantic Ocean as part of flood-control measures. Keta Municipal Chief Executive Wisdom Seade said the floodgate is a key component of the Keta Sea Defence and lagoon management infrastructure, which helps regulate lagoon water levels during periods of heavy rainfall and tidal surges.

== Keta Lagoon ==
Keta Lagoon is the largest lagoon in Ghana with a water area of 300km^{2}. This is located in a larger wetlands protected area of 1200km^{2}. It is a stopping point for a large number of migratory birds and provides a breeding ground for sea turtles.The Keta Lagoon is known for its immense quantity of salt.

== Oil ==
Petroleum has been found at the Keta Basin. Experts are against the exploitation because it will lead to the destruction of land and lives, as well as some sources of livelihood.

== Development Projects ==
Keta has benefits from a number of initiatives towards development. This includes;

- Keta Sea Defense Project preventing sea erosion
- Keta Port Project - a maritime hub to include a fishing harbour, cruise terminal, cargo and shipyard activities.
- Keta Water Supply Rehabiltation Expansion to ease access to clean running water in the Municipality. A £ 97.184 funded project. However, the projected failed years in, due to delays and issues unknown. Report from the fourth estate stated the inconsistencies in not delivering the expectations of the project after a decade, leading residents to still struggle getting access to clean water.
- Keta Lagoon Blue Carbon Project to restore costal wetlands by planting 12 million native mangroves trees across 5000 to 6000 hectares of land.

== Notable people ==
- Dan Kwasi Abodakpi
- Charles Sterling Acolatse
- Kofi Adjorlolo
- Ben Akafia
- R. S. Amegashie
- Fred Kwasi Apaloo
- Raphael Armattoe
- Christian Baëta
- Emmanuel Kobla Bensah
- Esi Buobasa
- Christian Kobla Dovlo
- Ferdinand Kwasi Fiawoo
- Kwame Dzudzorli Gakpey
- Marricke Kofi Gane
- Philip Gbeho
- Victor Gbeho
- GlennSamm
- P. K. D. Habadah
- Eric Kwame Heymann
- Clement Kofi Humado
- Annie Jiagge
- Emmanuel Kwasi Kotoka
- Richard Agbenyefia Lassey
- G. S. Lassey
- MzVee
- Paul Nkegbe
- Daniel Ahmling Chapman Nyaho
- Courage Quashigah
- Ivan Quashigah
- Richard Quashigah
- Jerry John Rawlings
- Epiphan Patrick Komla Seddoh
- Francis Selormey
- Anthony Hugh Selormey
- Albert Gregorio De Souza
- Clend Mawuko Sowu
- Togbi Sri II
- Kojo Tsikata
- Tsatsu Tsikata
- Charity Zormelo

== See also ==
- Dzelukofe
- Anloga
