= Emmanuel Kodjoe Dadzie =

Ghanaian politician (1916–1983)

Ghana Ambassador to Romania
- In office 1962–1966

Ghana Ambassador to France
- In office 1965–1967
- Preceded by: Jonathan Emmanuel Bossman
- Succeeded by: Epiphan Patrick Komla Seddoh

Ghana Ambassador to Russia
- In office 1969–1969
- Preceded by: John Banks Elliott
- Succeeded by: John Ewuntomah Bawah

Personal details
- Born: Emmanuel Kodjoe Dadzie; 16 March 1916
- Died: March 1983 (aged 66–67)
- Children: 3 daughters (inc. Stella Dadzie) and 2 sons

Emmanuel Kodjoe Dadzie (16 March 1916 – March 1983) was a Ghanaian diplomat.

== Early years and education ==
His secondary education was at Achimota School in Accra and his tertiary education at King's College London.

== Career ==
He was a member of Lincoln's Inn and a barrister in London. He served in the Gold Coast Civil Service from 1936 to 1942. From 1942 to 1947, he was employed by the Royal Air Force of Britain.

From 1951 to 1959, Dadzie was in private legal practice in Accra. In 1959, he headed the legal service and consular service of the Ministry of Foreign Affairs. He was made Ghana's ambassador to Romania in Bucharest, from 1962 to 1966. From 1963 to 1966, he was resident representative of Ghana before the International Atomic Energy Agency in Vienna. From 1965 to 1967, he was Ghana's Ambassador to France in Paris and Permanent Representative to Unesco. In 1968, he was Ambassador to the Ministry of Foreign Affairs in Accra. In 1969, he was Ghana's ambassador to Russia in Moscow. In 1970, he was Director of the Policy Planning Division of the Ministry of Foreign Affairs. In 1971, he was the main secretary, Ministry of Foreign Affairs. From 1972 to 1977, he was Director of Protection at the United Nations High Commissioner for Refugees in Geneva. From 1977 to 1982, he was elected member of the International Law Commission.

== Personal life ==
In 1962, Dadzie married Theresa Striggner, with whom he had a daughter. His second marriage was to Irma La Rose. He had three daughters and two sons, his second daughter being Stella Dadzie, a well known feminist writer and education activist in the UK.
