= List of lighthouses in Ghana =

This is a list of lighthouses in Ghana, which are located along the Atlantic coastline of the country.

- Bobwasi Island
- Cape St. Paul Lighthouse in Woe
- Cape Three Points
- Chemu Point
- Fort Orange
- Fort William (Lighthouse) in Cape Coast
- Jamestown Lighthouse in Accra
- Takoradi

== See also ==
- List of lighthouses in Ivory Coast (to the west)
- List of lighthouses in Togo (to the east)
- Lists of lighthouses and lightvessels
