= Christian Kobla Dovlo =

Ghanaian politician

Member of the Ghana Parliament for Keta Constituency

Personal details
- Born: February 1, 1910 Keta, Volta Region
- Died: 1996
- Party: Convention People's Party
- Education: Achimota College, New College
- Occupation: Principal
- Profession: Educator

Christian Kobla Dovlo was a Ghanaian politician.

== Early life and education ==
Dovlo was born on 1 February 1910. He hailed from Keta in the Volta Region of Ghana. He attended the E.P. School in Keta from 1912 to 1928 for his basic education. He further attended the Presbyterian Training College in Akropong in the Eastern Region of Ghana from 1929 to 1932. He also attended the E.P Seminary in Ho in the Volta Region of Ghana in 1939. He also attended Achimota College in 1940 and also Trinity College in Kumasi in the Ashanti Region of Ghana from 1944 to 1946. He further attended New College in Edinburgh in Scotland.

== Career ==
Dovlo was the principal of Zion College in Keta. He was also the headmaster for the Keta Grammar School. In April 1962, he was declared the member of Parliament for the Keta Constituency.

== Death ==
Dovlo died on 9 March 1996.
