= History of the Soviet Union (1953–1964) =

Khrushchev era
- 1953–1964
History of the Soviet Union (1927–1953)	History of the Soviet Union (1964–1982)
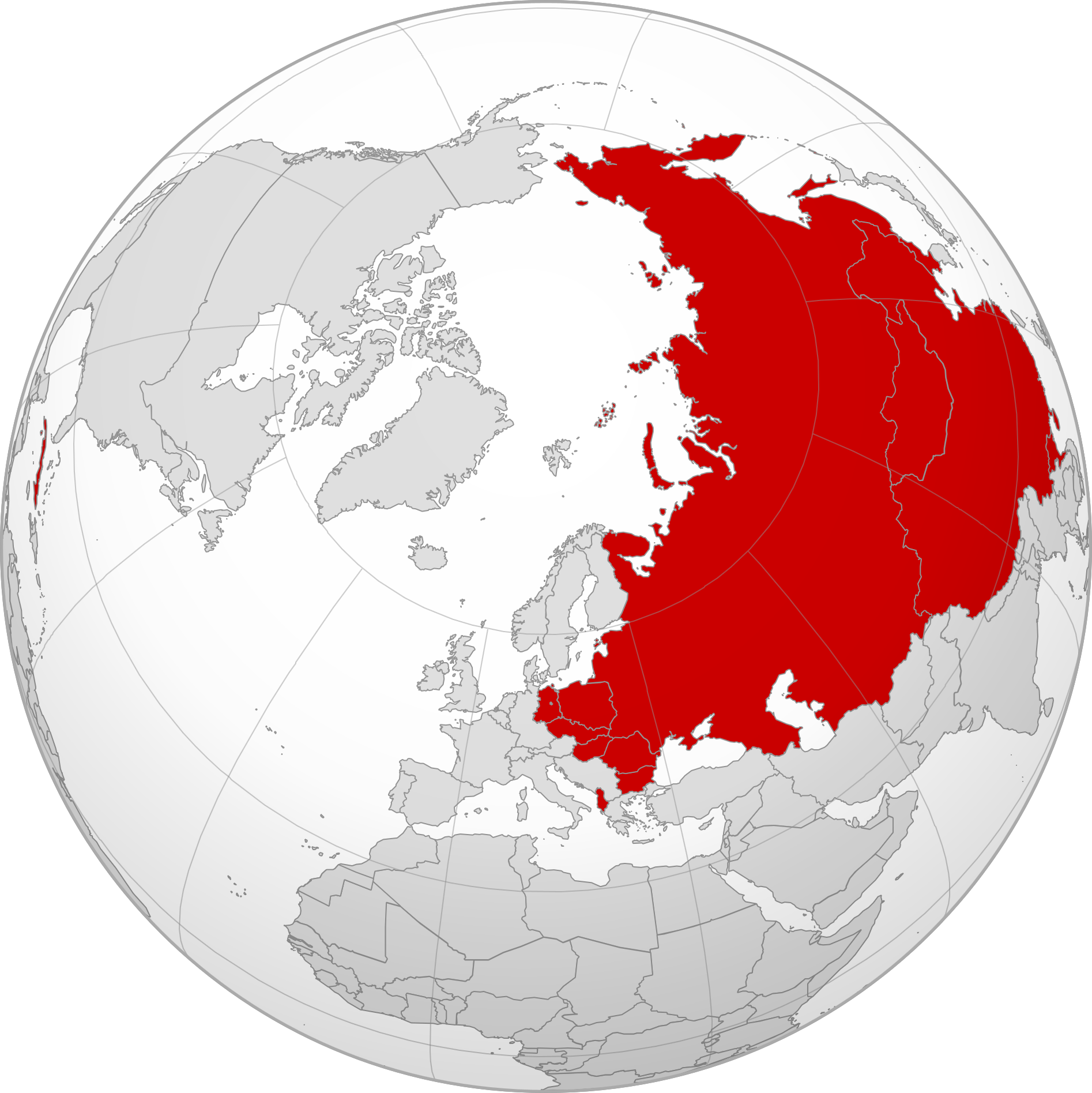
- The USSR: the maximum extent of the Soviet sphere of influence, after the Cuban Revolution (1959) and before the Sino-Soviet split (1961).
- Location: Soviet Union
- Including: Cold War
- Leader(s): Georgy Malenkov; Nikita Khrushchev
- Key events: East German uprising of 1953; Vietnam War; Suez Crisis; Space Race; On the Cult of Personality and Its Consequences; De-Stalinization; Hungarian Revolution of 1956; Virgin Lands campaign Cuban Revolution; 1959 Tibetan uprising Sino–Soviet split Novocherkassk massacre Cuban Missile Crisis; Indonesia–Malaysia confrontation 1963 Moscow protest

In the USSR, during the eleven-year period from the death of Joseph Stalin (1953) to the political ouster of Nikita Khrushchev (1964), the national politics were dominated by the Cold War, including the U.S.–USSR struggle for the global spread of their respective socio-economic systems and ideology, and the defense of hegemonic spheres of influence. Since the mid-1950s, despite the Communist Party of the Soviet Union (CPSU) having disowned Stalinism, the political culture of Stalinism — a very powerful General Secretary of the CPSU — remained in place, albeit weakened.

== Politics ==
=== Stalin's immediate legacy ===
After Stalin died in March 1953, he was succeeded formally by Nikita Khrushchev as First Secretary of the Central Committee of the Communist Party of the Soviet Union (CPSU) and Georgy Malenkov as Premier of the Soviet Union. However the central figure in the immediate post-Stalin period was Lavrentiy Beria, the former head of the state security apparatus.

Stalin had left the Soviet Union in an unenviable state when he died. At least 2.5 million people languished in prison and in labor camps, science and the arts had been subjugated to socialist realism, and agriculture productivity on the whole was meager. The country had only one quarter of the livestock it had had in 1928 and in some areas, there were fewer animals than there had been at the start of World War I. Private plots accounted for at least one quarter of meat, dairy, and produce output. Living standards were low and consumer goods scarce. Moscow was also remarkably isolated and friendless on the international stage; Eastern Europe excluding Yugoslavia was held to the Soviet yoke by military occupation and soon after Stalin's death, protests and revolts would break out in some Eastern Bloc countries. China paid homage to the departed Soviet leader, but held a series of grudges that would soon boil over.

=== Post-Stalin Interregnum ===
==== Domestic policy ====
As Deputy Premier of the Soviet Union, Lavrentiy Beria (notwithstanding his record as part of Stalin's terror state) initiated a period of relative liberalisation, including the release of some political prisoners. Almost as soon as Stalin was buried, Beria ordered Vyacheslav Molotov's wife freed from imprisonment and personally delivered her to the Soviet foreign minister. He also directed the Ministry of Internal Affairs (MVD) to reexamine the Doctors' Plot and other "false" cases. Beria next proposed stripping the MVD of some of its economic assets and transferring control of them to other ministries, followed by the proposal to stop using forced labour on construction projects. He then announced that 1.1 million non-political prisoners were to be freed from captivity, that the Ministry of Justice should assume control of labour camps from the MVD, and that the Doctors' Plot was false. Finally, he ordered a halt to physical and psychological abuse of prisoners. Beria also declared a halt to forced Russification of the Soviet republics; Beria himself was a Georgian.

The leadership also began allowing some criticism of Stalin, saying that his one-man dictatorship went against the principles laid down by Vladimir Lenin. The war hysteria that characterized his last years was toned down, and government bureaucrats and factory managers were allowed to wear civilian clothing instead of military-style outfits. Estonia, Latvia and Lithuania were given serious prospects of national autonomy, possibly similarly to other Soviet satellite states in Europe.

==== Foreign policy ====
Beria also turned his attention to foreign policy. A secret letter found among his papers after his death, suggested restoring relations with Titoist Yugoslavia. He also criticized Soviet handling of Eastern Europe and the numerous "mini-Stalins" such as Hungary's Mátyás Rákosi. East Germany particularly was in a tenuous situation in 1953 as the attempt by its leader Walter Ulbricht to impose all-out Stalinism had cause a mass exodus of people to the West. Beria suggested that East Germany should just be forgotten about entirely and there was "no purpose" for its existence. He revived the proposal Stalin had made to the Allies in 1946 for the creation of a united, neutral Germany.

==== Opposition to Beria ====
Beria displayed a considerable degree of contempt for the rest of the Politburo, letting it be known that they were "complicit" in Stalin's crimes. However, it was not deep-rooted ideological disagreements that turned them against Beria. Khrushchev in particular was appalled at the idea of abandoning East Germany and allowing the restoration of capitalism there, but that alone was not enough to plot Beria's downfall and he even supported the new, more enlightened policy towards non-Russian nationalities. The Politburo soon began stonewalling Beria's reforms and trying to prevent them from passing. One proposal, to reduce sentences handed down by the MVD to 10 years max, was later claimed by Khrushchev to be a ruse. "He wants to be able to sentence people to ten years in the camps, and then when they're freed, sentence them to another ten years. This is his way of grinding them down." Molotov was the strongest opponent of abandoning East Germany, and found in Khrushchev an unexpected ally.

By late June, it was decided that Beria could not simply be ignored or sidelined, he had to be taken out. They had him arrested on 26 June with the support of the armed forces. At the end of the year, he was shot following a show trial where he was accused of spying for the West, committing sabotage, and plotting to restore capitalism. The secret police were disarmed and reorganized into the KGB, ensuring that they were completely under the control of the party and would never again be able to wage mass terror.

==== Malenkov-Khrushchev duumvirate ====
For a time after Beria's deposition, Georgi Malenkov was generally considered the senior-most figure in the Politburo. Malenkov, an artistic-minded man who courted intellectuals and artists, had little use for bloodshed or state terror. He called for greater support of private agricultural plots and liberation of the arts from rigid socialist realism and he also criticized the pseudoscience of biologist Trofim Lysenko. In a November 1953 speech, Malenkov denounced corruption in various government agencies. He also reappraised Soviet views of the outside world and relations with the West, arguing that there were no disputes with the United States and her allies that could not be resolved peacefully, and that nuclear war with the West would simply bring about the destruction of all parties involved.

Within the same period, Nikita Khrushchev likewise emerged as a prominent figure in Soviet politics. Khrushchev proposed greater agricultural reforms, although he still refused to abandon the concept of collective farming and continued to support Lysenko's pseudoscience. In a 1955 speech, he argued that Soviet agriculture needed a shot in the arm and that it was silly to keep blaming low productivity and failed harvests on Tsar Nicholas II, dead for almost 40 years. He also began allowing ordinary people to stroll the grounds of the Kremlin, which had been closed off except to high ranking state officials for over 20 years.

The late Stalin's reputation meanwhile started diminishing. His 75th birthday in December 1954 had been marked by extensive eulogies and commemorations in the state media as was the second anniversary of his death in March 1955. However, his 76th birthday at the end of the year was hardly mentioned.

The new leadership declared a major amnesty for certain categories of convicts, announced price cuts, and relaxed the restrictions on private plots. De-Stalinisation would come to spell an end to the role of large-scale forced labour in the economy.

==== Conflict within the collective leadership ====
During the period of collective leadership, Khrushchev gradually rose to power while Malenkov's power waned. Malenkov was criticised for his economic reform proposals and desire to reduce the CPSU's direct involvement in the day-to-day running of the state. Molotov called his warning that nuclear war would end all of civilisation to be "nonsense" since according to Karl Marx, the collapse of capitalism was a historical inevitability. Khrushchev accused Malenkov of supporting Beria's plan to abandon East Germany, and of being a "capitulationist, social democrat, and a Menshevist".

Khrushchev was also headed for a showdown with Molotov, after having initially respected and left him alone in the immediate aftermath of Stalin's death. Molotov began criticizing some of Khrushchev's ideas and the latter accused him in turn of being an out-of-touch ideologue who never left his dacha or the Kremlin to visit farms or factories. Molotov attacked Khrushchev's suggestions for agricultural reform and also his plans to construct cheap, prefab apartments to alleviate Moscow's severe housing shortages. Khrushchev also endorsed restoring ties with Yugoslavia, the split with Belgrade having been heavily engineered by Molotov, who continued to denounce Tito as a fascist. A 1955 visit by Khrushchev to Yugoslavia patched up relations with that country, but Molotov refused to back down. The near-total isolation of the Soviet Union from the outside world was also blamed by Khrushchev on Molotov's handling of foreign policy and the former admitted in a speech to the Central Committee the obvious Soviet complicity in starting the Korean War.

=== 20th Congress of the CPSU ===
At a closed session of the 20th Congress of the CPSU on 25 February 1956, Khrushchev shocked his listeners by denouncing Stalin's dictatorial rule and cult of personality in a speech entitled On the Cult of Personality and its Consequences. He also attacked the crimes committed by Stalin's closest associates. Furthermore, he stated that the orthodox view of war between the capitalist and communist worlds being inevitable was no longer true. He advocated competition with the West rather than outright hostility, stating that capitalism would decay from within and that world socialism would triumph peacefully. But, he added, if the capitalists did desire war, the Soviet Union would respond in kind.

=== De-Stalinisation ===
The impact of the 20th Congress on Soviet politics was immense. Khrushchev's speech stripped the legitimacy of his remaining Stalinist rivals, dramatically boosting his power domestically. Afterwards, Khrushchev eased restrictions and freed over a million prisoners from the Gulag, leaving an estimated 1.5 million prisoners living in a semi-reformed prison system (though a wave of counter-reform followed in the 1960s). Communists around the world were shocked and confused by his condemnation of Stalin, and the speech "...caused a veritable revolution (the word is not too strong) in peoples attitudes throughout the Soviet Union and Eastern Europe. It was the single factor in breaking down the mixture of fear, fanaticism, naivety and 'doublethink' with which everyone...had reacted to Communist rule".

==== Among Soviet intellectuals ====
Many Soviet intellectuals groused that Khrushchev and the rest of the Central Committee had willingly aided and abetted Stalin's crimes and that the late tyrant could not possibly have done everything himself. Furthermore, they asked why it had taken three years to condemn him and noted that Khrushchev mostly criticised what had happened to fellow Party members while completely overlooking far greater atrocities such as the Holodomor and mass deportations from the Baltic States during and after World War II, none of which were allowed to be mentioned in the Soviet press until the end of the 1980s. During the Secret Speech, Khrushchev had tried in an awkward manner to explain why he and his colleagues had not raised their voices against Stalin by saying that they all feared their own destruction if they did not comply with his demands.

==== Pro-Stalin demonstrations ====
In Stalin's native Georgia, massive crowds of pro-Stalin demonstrators rioted in the streets of Tbilisi and even demanded that Georgia secede from the USSR. Army troops had to be called in to restore order, with 20 deaths, 60 injuries, and scores of arrests.

==== Response from Soviet youth ====
In April 1956, there were reports that Stalin busts and portraits around the country had been vandalized or pulled down and some student groups rioted and demanded that Stalin be posthumously expelled from the party and his body taken down from its spot next to Lenin. Party and student meetings called for proper rule of law in the country and even free elections. A 25 year old Mikhail Gorbachev, then a member of the Komsomol in Stavropol reported that reaction to the Secret Speech was explosive and there were strong reactions between people, particularly, young, educated people, who supported it and hated Stalin, others who denounced it and still held the late tyrant in awe, and others who thought it was irrelevant compared to grassroots issues such as food and housing availability. The Presidium responded by issuing a resolution condemning "anti-party" and "anti-Soviet" slanderers and the 7 April Pravda reprinted an editorial from China's People's Daily calling on party members to study Stalin's teachings and honour his memory. A Central Committee meeting on 30 June issued a resolution criticising Stalin merely for "serious errors" and "practicing a cult of personality" but holding the Soviet system itself blameless.

==== International reception ====
Some of the communist world, in particular China, North Korea, and Albania, stridently rejected de-Stalinisation. An editorial in the People's Daily argued that "Stalin made some mistakes, but on the whole he was a good, honest Marxist and his positives outweighed the negatives." Mao Zedong had many quarrels with Stalin, but thought that condemning him undermined the entire legitimacy of world socialism; "Stalin needed to be criticised, not killed" he said.

==== Rehabilitation during this period ====
By late 1955, thousands of political prisoners had been freed, but Soviet prisons and labour camps still held around 800,000 inmates and no attempt was made to investigate the Moscow Trials or rehabilitate their victims. Eventually several hundred thousand of Stalin's victims were rehabilitated, but the party officials purged in the Moscow Trials remained off the table. Khrushchev ordered an investigation into the trials of Mikhail Tukhachevsky and other army officers. The committee found that the charges leveled against them were baseless and their posthumous rehabilitation was announced in early 1957, but another investigation into the trials of Grigory Zinoviev, Lev Kamenev, and Nikolai Bukharin declared that all three had engaged in "anti-Soviet activity" and would not be rehabilitated. After Khrushchev defeated the "anti-party group" in 1957, he promised to re-open the cases, but ultimately never did so, in part because of the embarrassing fact that he himself had celebrated the elimination of the Old Bolsheviks during the purges.

==== Changing toponymy ====
As part of de-Stalinisation, Khrushchev set about renaming the numerous towns, cities, factories, natural features, and kolkhozes around the country named in honor of Stalin and his aides, most notably Stalingrad, site of the great WWII battle, was renamed to Volgograd in 1961.

=== Khrushchev consolidates power ===
==== Defeat of the Anti-Party Group ====
In 1957, Khrushchev had defeated a concerted Stalinist attempt to recapture power, decisively defeating the so-called "Anti-Party Group"; this event illustrated the new nature of Soviet politics. The most decisive attack on the Stalinists was delivered by defense minister Georgy Zhukov, and the implied threat to the plotters was clear; however, none of the "anti-party group" were killed or even arrested, and Khrushchev disposed of them quite cleverly: Georgy Malenkov was sent to manage a power station in Kazakhstan, and Vyacheslav Molotov, one of the most die-hard Stalinists, was made ambassador to Mongolia.

Eventually however, Molotov was reassigned to be the Soviet representative of the International Atomic Energy Commission in Vienna after the Kremlin decided to put some safe distance between him and China since Molotov was becoming increasingly cozy with the anti-Khrushchev Chinese Communist Party leadership. Molotov continued to attack Khrushchev every opportunity he got, and in 1960, on the occasion of Lenin's 90th birthday, wrote a piece describing his personal memories of the Soviet founding father and thus implying that he was closer to the Marxist-Leninist orthodoxy. In 1961, just prior to the 22nd CPSU Congress, Molotov wrote a vociferous denunciation of Khrushchev's party platform and was rewarded for this action with expulsion from the party.

Khrushchev's attack on the "anti-party group" drew negative reactions from China; the People's Daily remarked "How can [Molotov], one of the founding fathers of the CPSU, be a member of an anti-party group?"

Like Molotov, Foreign Minister Dmitri Shepilov also met the chopping block when he was sent to manage the Kirghizia Institute of Economics. Later, when he was appointed as a delegate to the Communist Party of Kirghizia conference, Khrushchev deputy Leonid Brezhnev intervened and ordered Shepilov dropped from the conference. He and his wife were evicted from their Moscow apartment and then reassigned to a smaller one that lay exposed to the fumes from a nearby food processing plant, and he was dropped from membership in the Soviet Academy of Sciences before being expelled from the party. Kliment Voroshilov held the ceremonial title of head of state despite his advancing age and declining health; he retired in 1960. Nikolai Bulganin ended up managing the Stavropol Economic Council. Also banished was Lazar Kaganovich, sent to manage a potash works in the Urals before being expelled from the party along with Molotov in 1962.

Despite his strong support for Khrushchev during the removal of Beria and the anti-party group, Zhukov was too popular and beloved of a figure for Khrushchev's comfort, so he was removed as well. In addition, while leading the attack against Molotov, Malenkov, and Kaganovich, he also insinuated that Khrushchev himself had been complicit in the 1930s purges, which in fact he had. While Zhukov was on a visit to Albania in October 1957, Khrushchev plotted his downfall. When Zhukov returned to Moscow, he was promptly accused of trying to remove the Soviet military from party control, creating a cult of personality around himself, and of plotting to seize power in a coup. Several Soviet generals went on to accuse Zhukov of "egomania", "shameless self-aggrandizement", and of tyrannical behaviour during WWII. Zhukov was expelled from his post as defense minister and forced into retirement from the military on the grounds of his "advanced age" (he was 62). Marshal Rodin Malinovsky took Zhukov's place as defense minister.

==== Election to Premiership ====
Khrushchev was elected Premier on 27 March 1958, consolidating his power—the tradition followed by all his predecessors and successors. This was the final stage in the transition from the earlier period of post-Stalin collective leadership. He was now the ultimate source of authority in the Soviet Union, but would never possess the absolute power Stalin had.

=== 21st Congress of the CPSU ===
The Seven-year plan marked by 1959 postage stamps

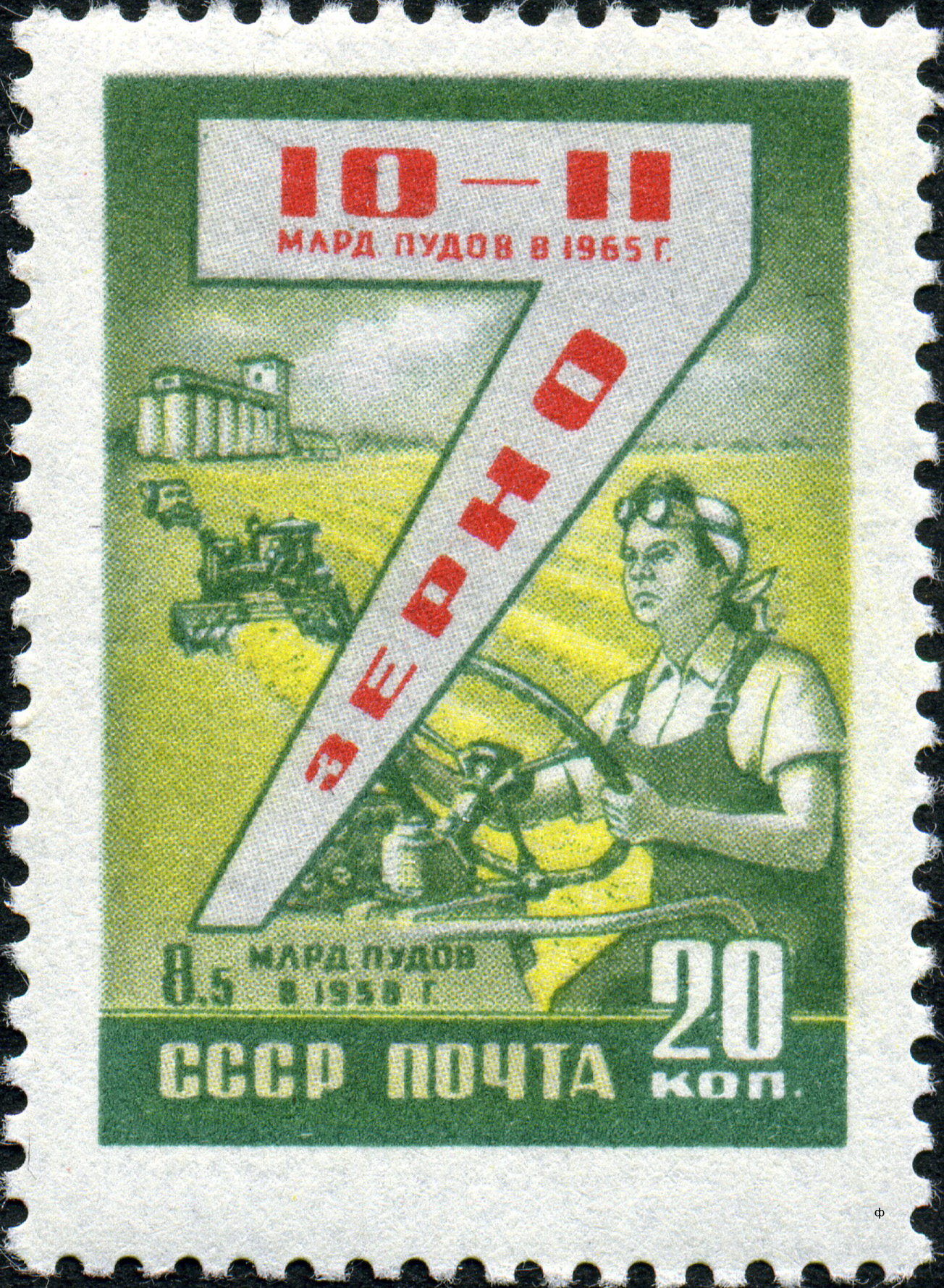
Grain to increase from 8.5 milliard poods (139 million tonnes) in 1958 to 10–11 milliard poods (~172 million tonnes) by 1965

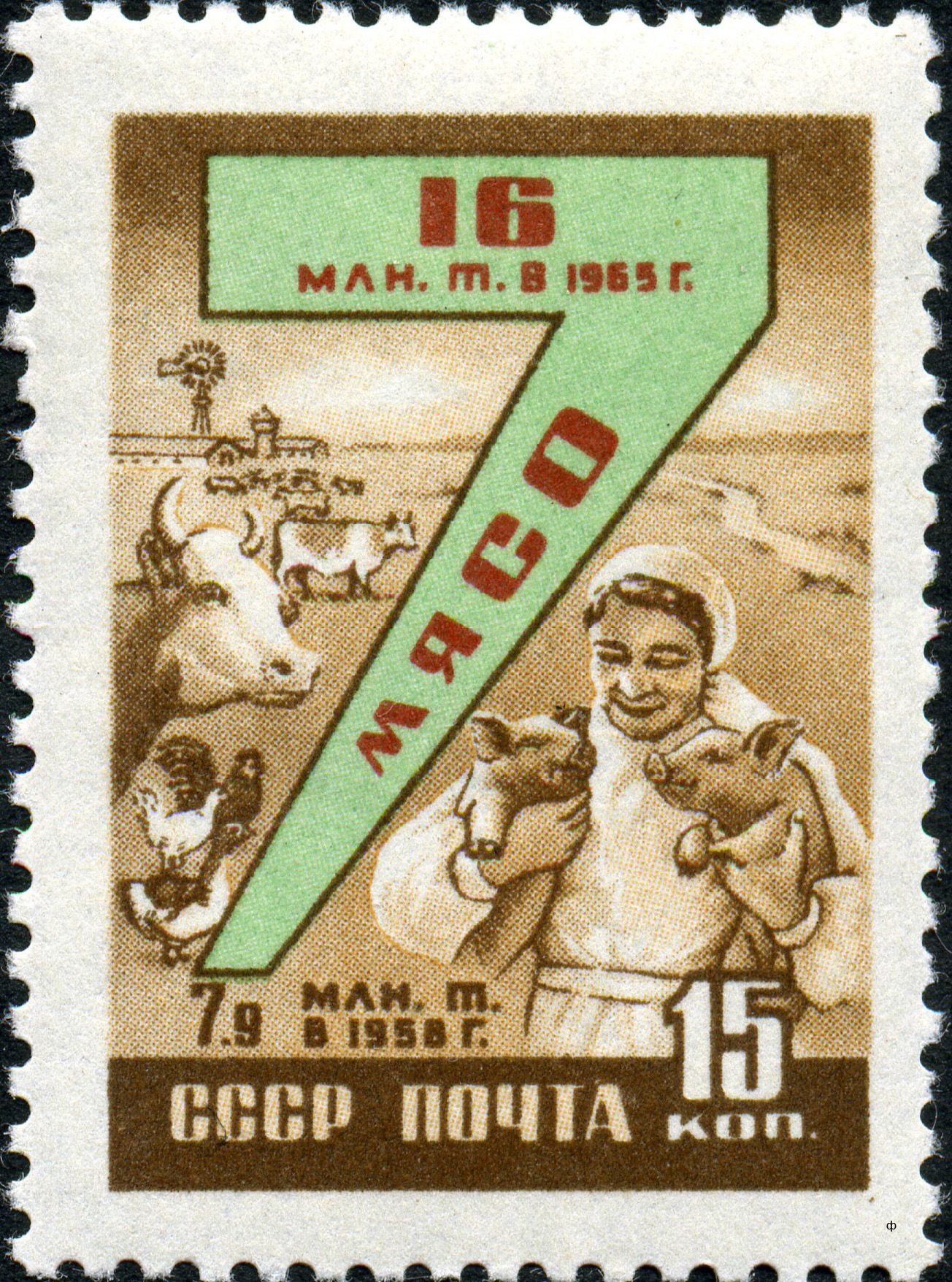
Meat to increase from 7.9 million tonnes in 1958 to 16 million tonnes by 1965

In 1959, between 27 January and 5 February, the 21st Congress of the CPSU took place; it was an "Extraordinary" Congress, timed so that Khrushchev could consolidate his power over rivals not long after the attempted coup of the "anti-party group" in 1957. It was during this congress that the unusual Seven-Year Plan was adopted, cutting short and replacing the Sixth Five-Year Plan that had been adopted in 1956. The Seven-Year Plan would itself be cut short two years before its completion, retroactively becoming the seventh five-year plan.

=== 22nd Congress of the CPSU ===
The 22nd Congress of the CPSU, which convened from 17–21 October 1961, marked the apex of Khrushchev's power and prestige, despite there being already mounting doubts about his policies. However, the real opposition to him had yet to come and he glowed in the praise of the CPSU delegates as he read off the general report of the Central Committee and the party program, two monumental speeches that lasted a total of ten hours. Within a decade, Khrushchev declared, the Soviet people would have equal living standards and material comforts with the United States and Western Europe. In addition, the 22nd Congress saw a renewed attack on Stalin, which culminated in the expulsion of remaining Old Bolsheviks like Molotov and Kaganovich from the party. Stalin's embalmed body, which still lay in Red Square next to Lenin, was immediately removed and reburied in the Kremlin Wall.

=== Khrushchev voted out of office ===
In October 1964, while Khrushchev was on holiday in Crimea, the Presidium unanimously voted him out of office and refused to permit him to take his case to the Central Committee. He retired as a private citizen after an editorial in Pravda denounced him for "hare-brained schemes, half−baked conclusions, hasty decisions, and actions divorced from reality".

== Reforms during Khrushchev's administration ==
Throughout his years of leadership, Khrushchev oversaw attempted reforms in a range of fields.

=== Khrushchev Thaw ===
Khrushchev initiated "The Thaw", a complex shift in political, cultural, and economic life in the Soviet Union. That included some openness and contact with other countries and new social and economic policies with more emphasis on commodity goods, allowing living standards to rise dramatically while maintaining high levels of economic growth. Censorship was relaxed as well. Some subtle critiques of the Soviet society were tolerated, and artists were not expected to produce only works which had government-approved political context. Still, artists, most of whom were proud of both the country and the Party, were careful not to get into trouble. However, he reintroduced aggressive anti-religious campaigns, closing down many houses of worship.

==== Impact on the Eastern Bloc ====
Such loosening of controls also caused an enormous impact on other socialist countries in Central Europe, many of which were resentful of Soviet influence in their affairs. Riots broke out in Poland in the summer of 1956, which led to reprisals from national forces there. A political convulsion soon followed, leading to the rise of Władysław Gomułka to power in October. This almost triggered a Soviet invasion when Polish Communists elected him without consulting the Kremlin in advance, but in the end, Khrushchev backed down due to Gomułka's widespread popularity in the country. Poland would still remain a member of the Warsaw Pact (established a year earlier), and in return, the Soviet Union seldom intervened in its neighbors' domestic and external affairs. Khrushchev also began reaching out to newly independent countries in Asia and Africa, which was in sharp contrast to Stalin's Europe-centered foreign policy. And in September 1959, he became the first Soviet leader to visit the US.

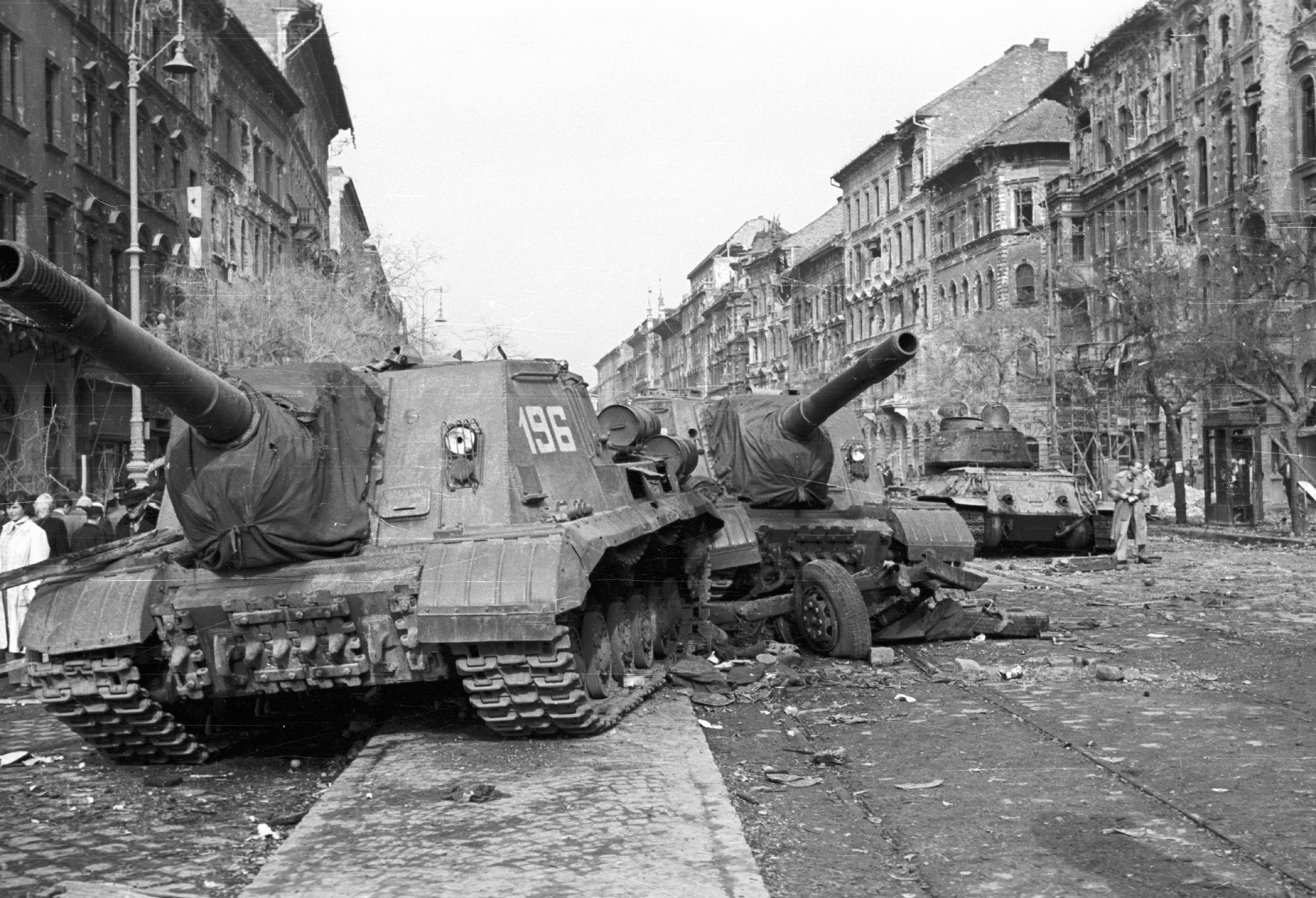
Soviet machinery abandoned in Budapest during the 1956 Soviet invasion of Hungary

In November 1956, the Hungarian Revolution was brutally suppressed by Soviet troops. About 2,500–3,000 Hungarian insurgents and 700 Soviet troops were killed, thousands more were wounded, and nearly a quarter million left the country as refugees. The Hungarian uprising was a blow to Western communists; many who had formerly supported the Soviet Union began to criticize it in the wake of the Soviet suppression of the Hungarian uprising.

=== Agriculture ===
Back in the early 1950s, Khrushchev had defended private plots as part of the collective leadership, which had introduced important innovations in the area of Soviet agriculture. It had encouraged peasants to grow more on their private plots, increased payments for crops grown on collective farms, and invested more heavily in agriculture.

However, beginning in the late 1950s, Khrushchev spoke of communal farming as inevitable. After Khrushchev had defeated his rivals and secured his position, he set his attention to economic reforms, particularly in the field of agriculture. "If a capitalist farmer required eight kilos of grain to produce one kilo of meat," he told a farmers' council, "he would lose his pants. Yet if a state farm director here does the same, he manages to keep his pants. Why? Because no one will hold him accountable for it".

Khrushchev's administration abolished the Machine Tractor Stations, which were rural agencies to provide farming equipment, and had them sell their inventory directly to the farmers, but the latter ended up incurring huge debts buying the farming equipment, which ended up being used less effectively than the MTS had done.

==== American farming techniques and maize ====
Khrushchev continued to believe in the theories of the biologist Trofim Lysenko, a carryover from the Stalin era, however, the Soviet leader looked to his country's greatest rival for inspiration. As far back as the 1940s, he had promoted the use of American farming techniques and even obtained seeds from the US, in particular from a cagey Iowa farmer named Roswell Garst, who believed positive trade and business relations with Moscow would ease superpower tensions. This led to Khrushchev's soon to be notorious fascination with growing maize, although most of the Soviet Union outside of Ukraine lacked a suitable climate and much of the infrastructure used by American farmers, including adequate mechanized equipment, knowledge of advanced farming techniques, and proper use of fertilizer and pesticides, was in short supply. Although Khrushchev's corn obsession was exaggerated by popular myth, he did nonetheless advocate any number of unrealistic ideas such as planting corn in Siberia.

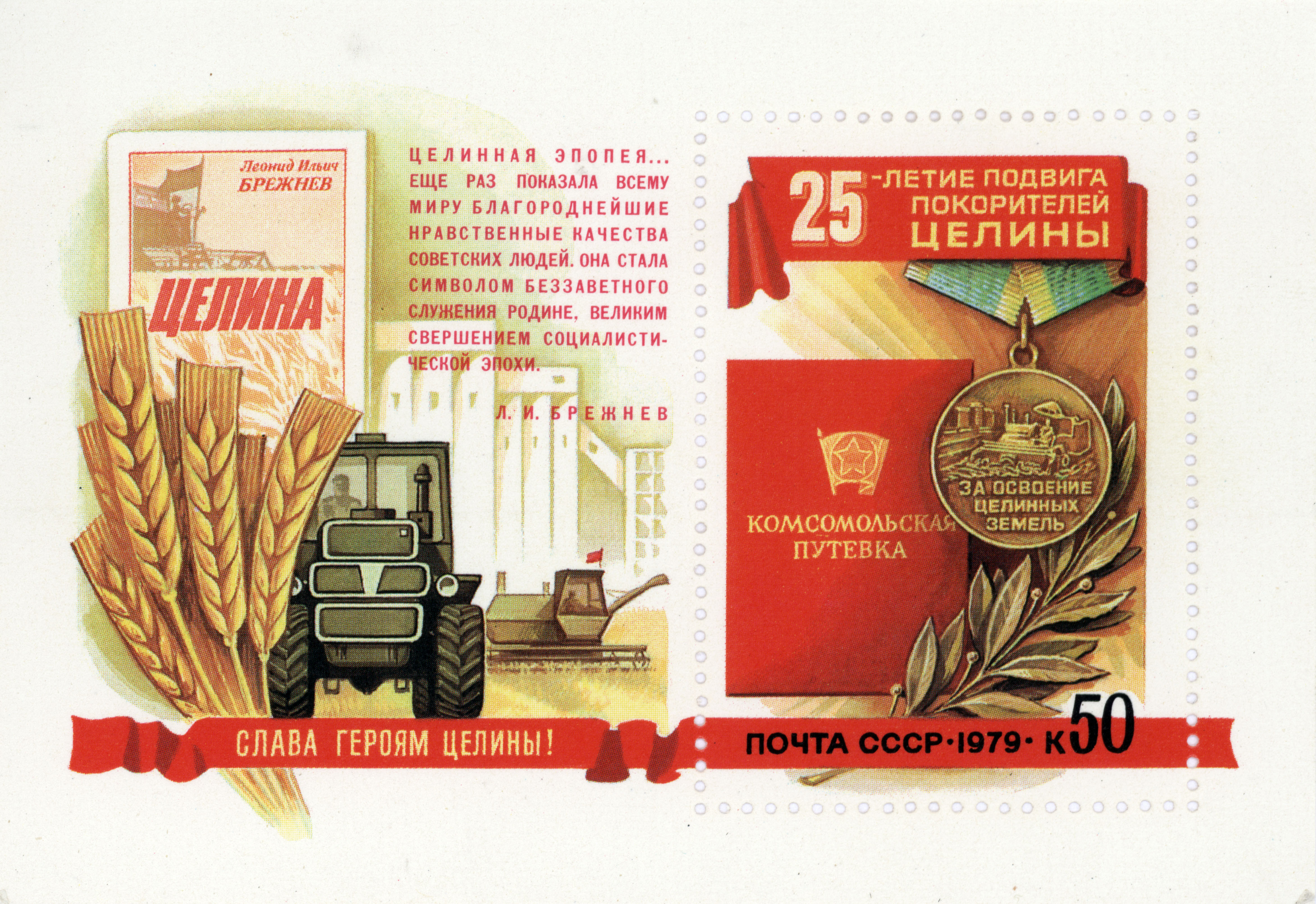
1979 postage stamp commemorating the Virgin Lands campaign

==== Virgin Lands Campaign ====
During the Virgin Lands Campaign in the mid-1950s, many tracts of land were opened to farming in Kazakhstan and neighbouring areas of Russia. These new farmlands turned out to be susceptible to droughts, but in some years they produced excellent harvests. Later agricultural reforms by Khrushchev, however, proved counterproductive. His plans for growing corn and increasing meat and dairy production failed, and his reorganisation of collective farms into larger units produced confusion in the countryside.

=== Industry ===
In a politically motivated move to weaken the central state bureaucracy in 1957, Khrushchev did away with the industrial ministries in Moscow and replaced them with regional economic councils (sovnarkhozes).

Although he intended these economic councils to be more responsive to local needs, the decentralisation of industry led to disruption and inefficiency. Connected with this decentralisation was Khrushchev's decision in 1962 to recast party organisations along economic, rather than administrative, lines. The resulting bifurcation of the party apparatus into industrial and agricultural sectors at the oblast (province) level and below contributed to the disarray and alienated many party officials at all levels. Symptomatic of the country's economic difficulties was the abandonment in 1963 of Khrushchev's special seven-year economic plan (1959–65) two years short of its completion.

=== Military ===
Khrushchev significantly reduced Soviet defense spending and the size of conventional forces, accusing the army of being "metal eaters" and "If you let the army have their way, they will eat up the country's entire resources and still claim it's not enough." Several warships under construction were scrapped as Khrushchev considered them useless, as well as plans for long range bombers. Orders for fighter planes slowed and several military airfields were converted to civilian use. Although he alienated the Soviet military establishment, he insisted that the country could not match the United States for conventional military capabilities and that the nuclear arsenal was sufficient deterrence. There were also practical reasons for this stance as the low birth rate of the 1940s caused a shortage of military-aged men.

The size of the Soviet military was reduced by nearly 2 million men in 1955–57, and further cuts followed in 1958 and 1960. These cuts in troop strength were not well planned out and many soldiers and officers were left jobless and homeless. Discontent in the military started building up.

Despite Khrushchev's boasts about Soviet missile capabilities, they were mostly bluster. The R-7 ICBM used to launch Sputnik was almost useless as a workable ICBM and Soviet missiles were launched from above-ground surface pads which were completely exposed to enemy attack. When Khrushchev suggested putting them in underground silos, Soviet rocket engineers argued that it could not be done until he stumbled across an article in an American technical journal describing the use of silos to house missiles. He admonished the rocket engineers for failing to pay attention to American technical developments and when the first Soviet silo launch took place in September 1959, Khrushchev took it as a personal triumph.

=== Science and technology ===
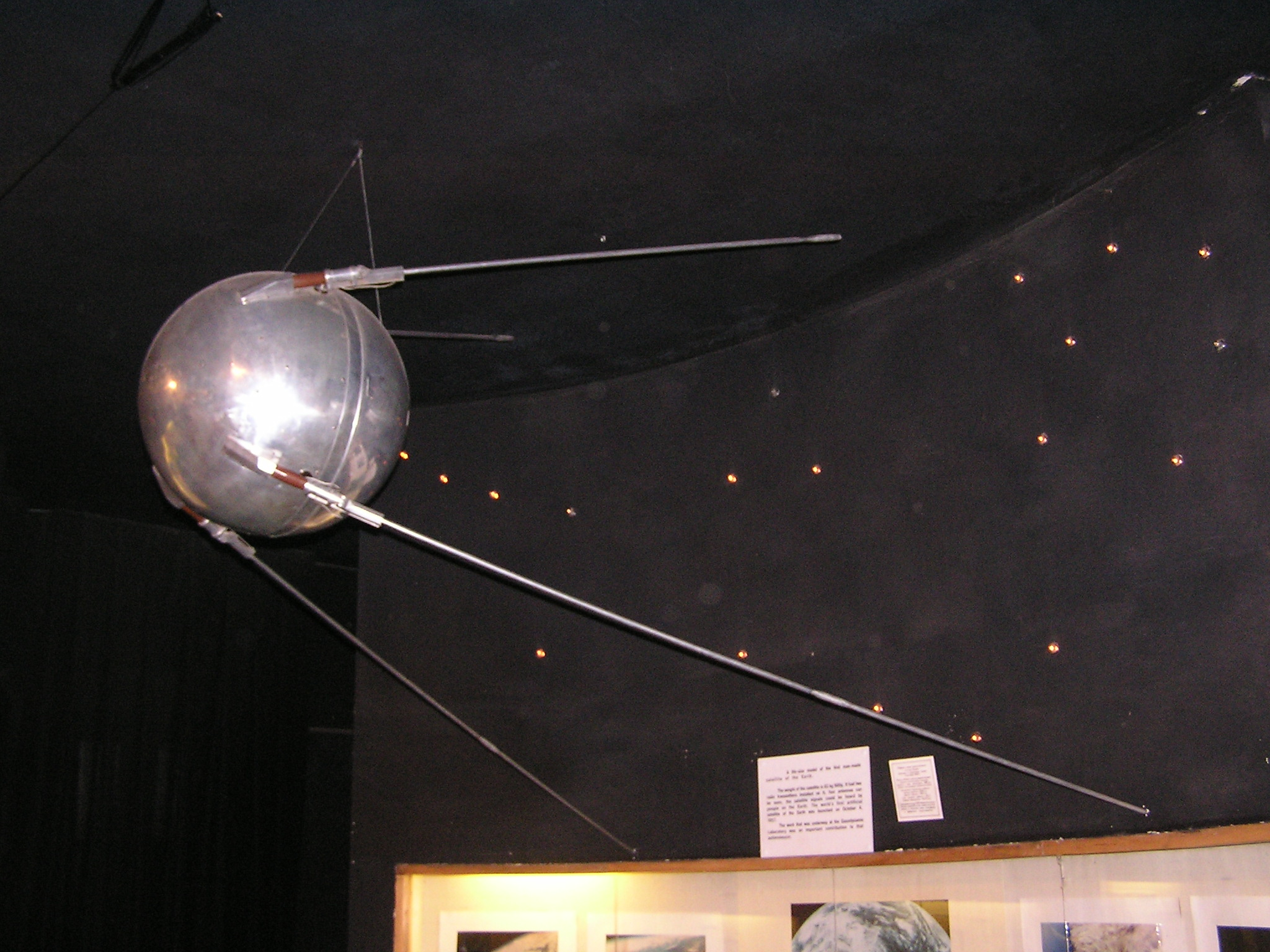
Replica of Sputnik 1

Aid to developing countries and scientific research, especially into space technology and weaponry, maintained the Soviet Union as one of the world's two major world powers. The Soviet Union launched the first ever artificial Earth satellite in history, Sputnik 1, which orbited the Earth in 1957. The Soviets also sent the first man into space, Yuri Gagarin, in 1961.

== Foreign relations ==
=== Yugoslavia and the Eastern Bloc ===
Khrushchev attempted to restore relations with Tito's Yugoslavia with a visit to Belgrade in May 1955, however the Yugoslavian leader was unmoved by an attempt by Khrushchev to blame Beria for the break with Yugoslavia. Khrushchev persisted and began urging the Eastern European bloc to restore ties with Yugoslavia. He also disbanded the Cominform, used as a club to beat Belgrade over the head with. The trip was reciprocated by a visit of Josip Broz Tito to Moscow in May 1956 where he was given a regal welcome and immense crowds dispatched to greet him. The Politburo members attempted to outdo each other in courting Tito and apologizing for Stalin, but the visit had no ultimate effect on Tito's foreign policy stance and he still refused to join the Soviet bloc, abandon his nonaligned stance, or cut off economic and military ties with the West. Worse than that, Tito began offering his nonaligned socialism to other countries, in particular Poland and Hungary.

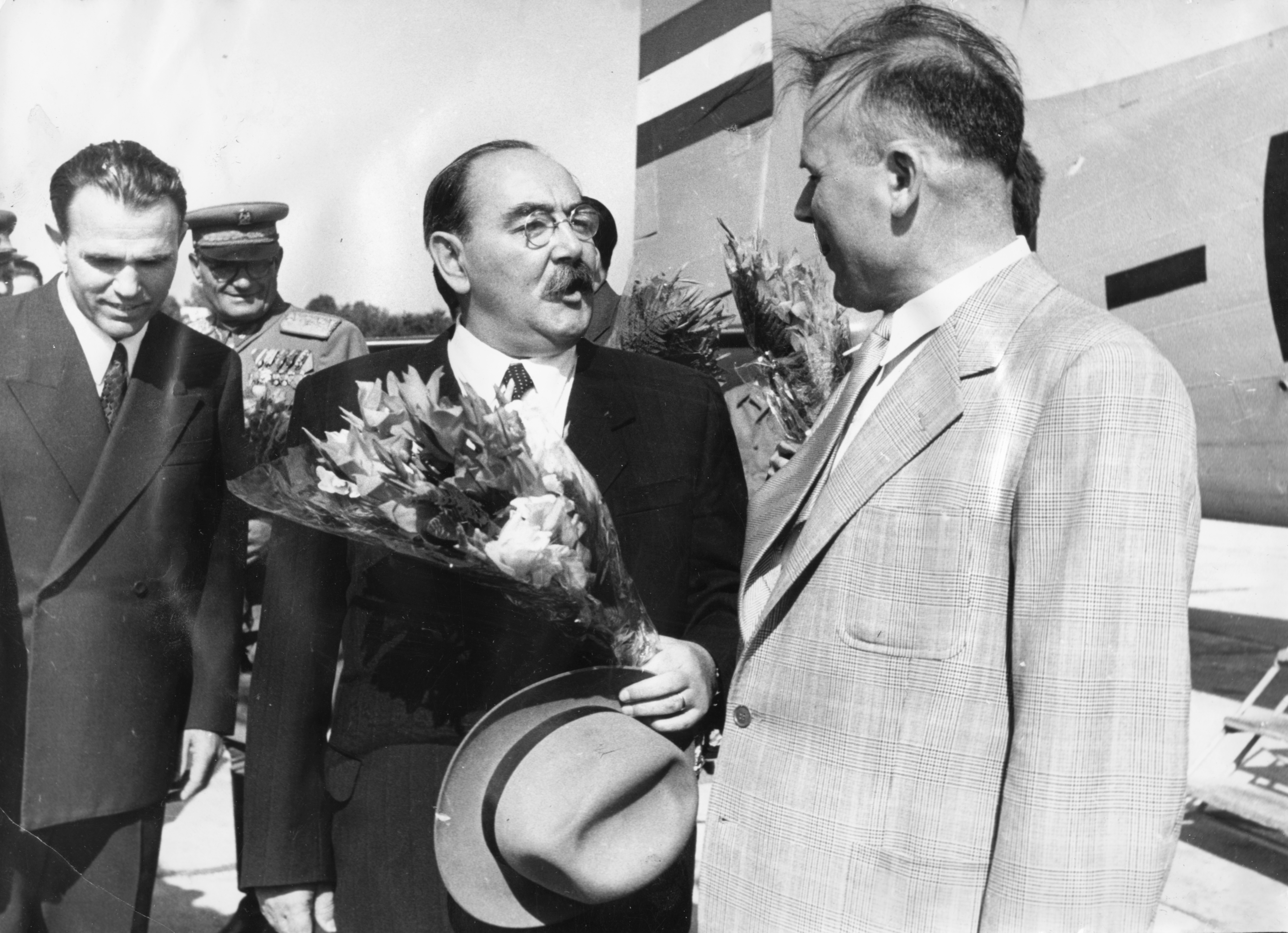
Imre Nagy (center) arriving in Moscow in 1953

After Hungarian leader Imre Nagy briefly took refuge in the Yugoslavian embassy in Budapest during the events of October 1956, Tito stayed aloof from the Soviet suppression of the Hungarian revolt and Soviet-Yugoslav relations waned from that point onward. Tito declined to attend the celebrations of the 40th anniversary of the Bolshevik Revolution in November 1957 and continued to actively promote his nonaligned stance at the Yugoslavian Communist Party's congress the following March. Khrushchev refused to send any delegates to the congress and authorized a lengthy denunciation of it in Pravda. Accusing Tito of being a traitor similar to Imre Nagy, Khrushchev ordered the execution of the Hungarian leader, who had been incarcerated for the last several months.

The uprisings in Poland and Hungary during 1956, which coincided with a softening of Khrushchev's anti-Stalin course (he told guests in a reception at the Chinese embassy in Moscow that "Stalinism is inseparable from Marxism") brought about renewed protests from various elements of Soviet society. Aside from the usual complaints from intellectuals, there were student demonstrations and reports of portraits of Soviet leaders in factories being vandalized or torn down. Despite the small scale of this public dissent, the Central Committee quickly approved harsh countermeasures and several hundred people were arrested during early 1957 and sentenced to several years in labour camps.

==== East Germany ====
East Germany continued to be a sticky situation. Khrushchev had initially hoped to obtain recognition for the GDR from the Western powers, but ended up making things worse. A mass exodus of GDR citizens to West Germany, mostly young, fit adults, continued unabated, which left the GDR's labour force drained of manpower. GDR leader Walter Ulbricht requested the use of Soviet guest workers to make up for labour shortages, a proposal that alarmed Khrushchev as it drew reminders of the use of Soviet slave labourers by Nazi Germany during WWII. On top of this, West German citizens were traveling to the East to buy low cost goods subsidized by Moscow, further increasing the amount of debt money the GDR owed to the USSR.

The problem of signing a peace treaty with West Germany loomed large and posed nearly insurmountable issues. Signing a peace treaty would likely result in an economic embargo of the GDR by West Germany which would require a twofold increase in Soviet assistance, something Moscow could ill afford.

=== China ===
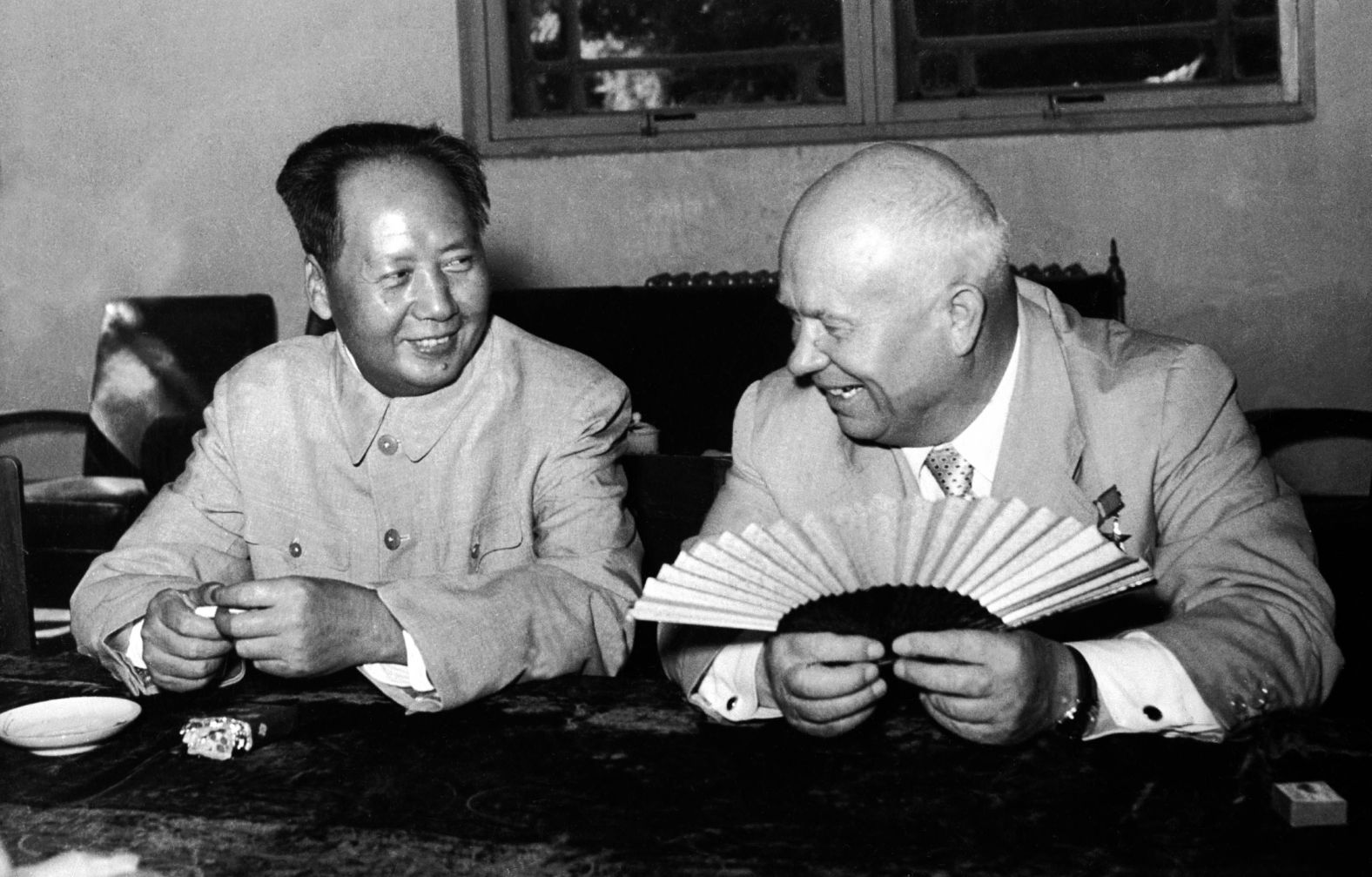
Mao Zedong (left) and Nikita Khrushchev (right) in 1958

Khrushchev ran afoul of China when he proposed a joint Sino-Soviet fleet in the Pacific to counter the US Seventh Fleet. Soviet ambassador to China Pavel Yudin was rebuffed by Mao Zedong in a July 1958 meeting. Mao demanded to talk to Khrushchev in person, so the latter obliged and flew to Beijing. The meeting proved no more successful than the previous one with Yudin and Mao continued to reject the idea of a joint fleet, allowing Soviet Navy warships to dock at Chinese ports in peacetime, and operating joint radar stations as an infringement on Chinese sovereignty. Shortly after Khrushchev went home, the Chinese People's Liberation Army shelled the islands of Kinmen (Quemoy) and Matsu in the Formosa Strait, provoking the US Seventh Fleet to the area in a major show of force. Moscow supported the Chinese shelling of the islands with reluctance and after American threats of force on China, Mao told an appalled Andrei Gromyko that he was more than willing to start a nuclear war with the imperialist powers.

After this, Sino-Soviet relations calmed during the next six months only to worsen again during the summer of 1959 when Khrushchev criticized the Great Leap Forward and remained noncommittal during a Chinese border clash with India. On 20 August, Moscow informed Beijing that they would not give them a proposed sample atomic bomb. When Khrushchev headed to Beijing in late September, just after his US trip, he was given an icy reception and further alienated the Chinese with his warm accounts of Americans and of Eisenhower. A suggestion by the Soviet premier to free American pilots captured by China during the Korean War was rejected as well as Beijing's recent actions in the Formosa Strait and the Indian border. The talks ended after only three days and Khrushchev went home despondent.

=== United States ===
==== Khrushchev visits the US ====
In September 1959, Khrushchev became the first Russian head of state to visit the United States. This groundbreaking trip was made on the new Tu-114 long range airliner despite still being an experimental aircraft, since the Soviet Union did not have any other plane capable of nonstop trans-Atlantic travel. The 13 day trip included meetings with American businessmen and labour leaders, Hollywood actors, and Roswell Garst's farm in Iowa. Khrushchev became openly dismayed when he was told he could not visit Disneyland because it was too difficult to guarantee his security there.

==== 1960 US presidential election ====
Khrushchev anxiously awaited the results of the 1960 United States presidential election, preferring Kennedy to Richard Nixon, whom he took as a hardline anti-communist cold warrior, and openly celebrated the former's victory on 8 November. In truth however, Khrushchev's opinion of Kennedy was mixed. He knew that the new president was from a wealthy background and Harvard-educated. On the other, Kennedy was the youngest elected US president at 43 and gave off the impression of inexperience and "a boy wearing his father's pants" that Khrushchev assumed he could pounce on and dominate. If however Kennedy was that weak, there stood the possibility that he could merely be a puppet of "reactionary" forces and the US military-industrial complex. Almost immediately after the polls closed on Election Day, Khrushchev attempted to barrage the president-elect with proposals and the hope of improved US-Soviet relations, specifically turning the clock back to the accommodating diplomatic atmosphere of President Franklin D. Roosevelt's time. However, Khrushchev was informed that he was acting too quickly and it would not be possible to have a formal summit with Kennedy until he took office in January, and even then, arranging such a meeting would still take time.

==== Kennedy-era ====
Khrushchev was pleased by Kennedy's inaugural address on 20 January 1961 and immediately offered to release American pilots shot down over the Soviet Union as an olive branch. Kennedy in his turn ordered a halt to US Postal Service censorship of Soviet publications, lifted a ban on the importation of Soviet crab meat, and ordered military officials to tone down anti-Soviet rhetoric in speeches.

In a report on 6 January concerning a world conference of 81 communist parties in Moscow the previous fall, Khrushchev stated that the triumph of socialism over capitalism was inevitable, but at the same time, a major conflict between the great powers on the scale of the two world wars was now unthinkable in the age of nuclear weapons. He also stated that local wars must be avoided, for they could erupt into major ones as had been the case with World War I. The only acceptable conflicts as Khrushchev saw it were anti-colonial wars of national liberation along the lines of Algeria's war of independence against France.

Although Eisenhower would have likely dismissed this speech as so much Soviet bluster, the inexperienced Kennedy became nervous and took it as a call to arms by Moscow. In his first State of the Union address on 30 January, he cautioned that "No one should think that either the Soviet Union or China has given up their desire for world domination, ambitions they forcefully restated only a short time ago. On the contrary, our aim is to show that aggression and subversion on their part is not an acceptable means to achieve these aims." These remarks were followed two days later by the first test launch of a Minuteman ICBM.

U.S. newsreel about the Cuban Missile Crisis in 1962

Khrushchev's initial hopes for Kennedy gradually dimmed during the next few months. When Congolese leader Patrice Lumumba was assassinated, Khrushchev blamed it on Western colonialist forces. Khrushchev's boasts about Soviet missile forces provided John F. Kennedy with a key issue to use against Richard Nixon in the 1960 U.S. presidential election—the so-called 'missile gap'. But all Khrushchev's (probably sincere) attempts to build a strong personal relationship with the new president failed, resulting in the Cuban Missile Crises. After the Berlin and Cuba crises, tensions tapered off between the two superpowers.

Khrushchev openly wept at the news of Kennedy's assassination in November 1963, and feared that new US president Lyndon Johnson would pursue a more aggressive anti-Soviet stance. Johnson turned out to be more in favor of détente than Khrushchev had assumed, but would end up letting superpower relations take a backseat to his Great Society programs and the Vietnam War.

== Economy ==
=== During 1953-1955 ===
Since Stalin's death, Soviet agricultural output had improved measurably—gains in meat, dairy, and grain output were in the area of 130-150%, which led to Khrushchev making overconfident target dates for overtaking American farm production that eventually became a subject of derision.

=== During 1956-1958 ===
Alexsei Larionov, local party leader in Ryazan, attempted to triple meat production in the province after overall Soviet meat output for 1958 had been lacking (the grain harvest for comparison had been a strong one). The scheme, which was similar in nature to China's contemporary Great Leap Forward, involved setting unrealistic quotas and frantically slaughtering every animal in the province, including dairy cows and breeding stock, in an attempt to meet them. When the quotas still could not be met, Ryazan farmers tried to steal livestock from neighboring provinces, which took measures to protect their own farms such as police roadblocks. The Ryazan farmers resorted to theft of cattle under cover of darkness and Larionov, growing ever more desperate, made taxes payable in meat. In the end, Ryazan produced just 30,000 tons of meat for 1959, when they had promised 180,000 tons. The disgraced Larionov committed suicide shortly thereafter.

=== During 1959-1964 ===
The harvest for 1960 proved the worst since Stalin's death, and the Virgin Lands were especially disappointing. During the fall and winter of 1960–61, Khrushchev embarked on a furious campaign to improve agricultural shortcomings, most of which amounted to criticizing incompetent kolkhoz managers and promoting Lysenkoism and other quack scientific ideas while overlooking the real problem, which was the fundamental defects of collectivized agriculture.

The harvest for 1961 was disappointing, with agricultural output a mere 0.7% higher than 1960 and meat production actually less than the previous two years. Discontent began building, and in the face of it, Khrushchev continued to offer new proposals to improve farm output and condemnation of inefficient farming practices. Despite complaints from farmers that they lacked enough funding for tools and farm equipment, Khrushchev argued that he had no spare money to allot to agriculture. His only solution was to add yet more bureaucracy to the agricultural sector.

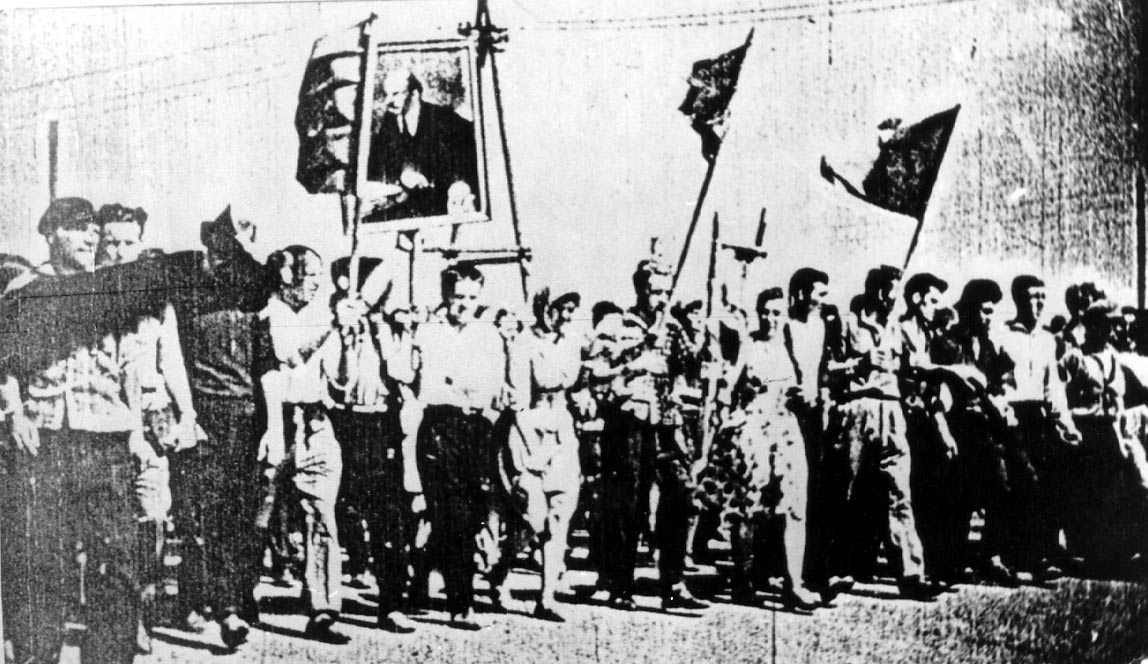
Protestors, displaying a portrait of Vladimir Lenin, marching right before the Novocherkassk massacre in 1962

Price increases of meat and dairy in the spring of 1962, combined with attempts to convince industrial workers to work harder for the same or less pay, paved the way for a mounting disaster. The price increases went into effect on 1 June and were immediately greeted by strikes and demonstrations in several cities, the biggest and most cataclysmic in the city of Novocherkassk where workers went on strike to protest rising costs of living and poor workplace conditions. The following day, workers at the Budenny Electric Locomotive Factory marched to the central square of the city where army units fired on them, killing 23. Another 116 demonstrators were arrested, with 14 tried for "anti-Soviet agitation" and seven of them sentenced to death. The other seven received 10–15 years in prison. Smaller riots in other cities were also put down with several fatalities. Khrushchev made a speech the same day half-apologizing for the price increases, but insisted that he had no choice. He never fully came to terms with the Novocherkassk massacre and did not bring it up in his memoirs.

During 1963, Khrushchev increasingly despaired over his inability to cure the perennial ailments of Soviet agriculture. He accused farmers of needlessly wasting fertilizer, adding that a farmer in the United States would be out of business if he did the same and he also complained about aging kolkhoz managers who should have retired and made way for younger men, but continued to hold onto their jobs. Drought affected a large portion of the west-central USSR during the fall months and overall the 1963 harvest was an abject failure with a mere 107 million tons of grain produced and there was serious consideration given to rationing. Khrushchev could offer no solutions other than empty sloganeering and criticizing incompetent managers. After initially bristling at the idea of importing grain from overseas, he finally gave in after learning that Soviet grain stocks were almost depleted, Khrushchev imported wheat mostly from Canada, but also from others like the United States, who exported wheat for the first time after World War II.

== See also ==
- History of the Soviet Union (1964–1982) (Brezhnev era)
- History of the Soviet Union (1982–1991) (Post-Brezhnev era and the Soviet dissolution)

== Bibliography ==
- Baradat, Leon P. (1986). Soviet Political Society. New Jersey: Prentice−Hall. ISBN 0-13-823592-9.
- Nenarokov, Albert P. (1968). Russia in the Twentieth Century: the View of a Soviet Historian. New York: William Morrow Co.
- Schapiro, Leonard (1971). The Communist Party of the Soviet Union. New York: Vintage Books. ISBN 0-394-70745-1.
