= Tsadidi Street Art Festival =

Street Art Festival in Ghana

Tsadidi Street Art Festival is a visual art and cultural exhibition organised in Ghana.

== Background ==
It was created by Ghanaian walking artist, Glenn Samm to complement the Hogbetsotso Festival. Similar to the Chalewote Street Art Festival, it features art processions, fashion and art exhibitions as well as mural graffiti across the town of Keta. The maiden edition was held in 2022 and since then, has been organised on the first Saturday of November to correspond with the Hogbetsotso Festival.
