= Keta (Ghana parliament constituency) =

Ghana parliament constituency

- constituency for the Parliament of Ghana
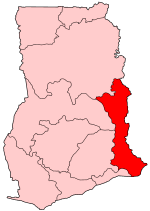
- District: Keta District
- Region: Volta Region of Ghana

Current constituency
- Party: National Democratic Congress
- MP: Kwame Dzudzorli Gakpey

Keta is one of the constituencies represented in the Parliament of Ghana. It elects one Member of Parliament (MP) by the first past the post system of election. Keta is located in the Keta district of the Volta Region of Ghana.

== Boundaries ==
The seat is one of two constituencies located within the Keta district of the Volta Region of Ghana. The other is the Anlo constituency.

== Members of Parliament ==
First elected	Member	Party
1956	Komla Agbeli Gbedemah	Convention People's Party
1965	Christian Kobla Dovlo	Convention People's Party
1969	Albert Gregorio De Souza	National Alliance of Liberals
1979	Leo P. Torsu	United National Convention
1992	Dan Abodakpi	National Democratic Congress
2008	Richard Agbenyefia-Lassey	National Democratic Congress
2012	Richard Quashigah	National Democratic Congress
2020	Kwame Dzudzorli Gakpey	National Democratic Congress

== Elections ==
2024 Ghanaian general election: Keta
Party	Candidate	Votes	%	±%
NDC	Kwame Dzudzorli Gakpey	29,471	88.04	+2.24
NPP	Courage Hope Goldberg-Grimm Lekettey	2,850	8.51	−5.19
Liberal Party of Ghana	Yayra Kwashie Kwawu	1,030	3.08	—
Independent	Dugah Stanley Courage	123	0.37	—
Majority		26,621	79.53	+7.43
Turnout		33,695	—	—
Registered electors		—		

2020 Ghanaian general election: Keta
Party	Candidate	Votes	%	±%
NDC	Kwame Dzudzorli Gakpey	31,470	85.8	−5.2
NPP	Benjamin Sena Kwame Dzameshie	5,037	13.7	+8.3
CPP	Blaise Edem Ametepey	166	0.5	−1.44
Majority		26,443	72.1	−13.5
Turnout		—	—	—

2016 Ghanaian general election: Keta
Party	Candidate	Votes	%	±%
NDC	Richard Quashigah	28,143	90.98	
NPP	Anthony Anani Kojo Desewu	1,665	5.38	
CPP	Mathias Kofi Adugu	601	1.94	—
PPP	Prosper Selassie Akpaganah	295	0.95	
NDP	Edem Mensah	230	0.74	
Majority		26,478	85.6	+4.6
Turnout		30,934		

2012 Ghanaian general election: Keta
Party	Candidate	Votes	%	±%
NDC	Richard Quashigah	33,570	92.43	
NPP	Vordzorgbe Alex Mawunyo Kwasi	1,272	3.50	
PPP	Wisdom Kwame Adonu	942	2.59	—
New Vision Party	Joseph Lugu	368	1.01	
NDP	Edem Mensah	166	0.46	
Majority				
Turnout		36,318		

2008 Ghanaian parliamentary election: Keta
Party	Candidate	Votes	%	±%
NDC	Richard Agbenyefia-Lassey	27,247	90.3	+2.8
NPP	Kudjoe Fianu	1,406	4.7	−1.8
CPP	Emmanuel Dzidzeme Aidam	1,093	3.6	—
People's National Convention (Ghana)	Ferdinand Fiawo Piccolo	437	1.4	+1.1
Majority		25,841	85.6	+4.6
Turnout		30,471	72.0	−19.1

2004 Ghanaian parliamentary election: Keta
Party	Candidate	Votes	%	±%
NDC	Dan Abodakpi	26,803	87.5	−3.4
NPP	Kudjoe Fianoo	1,976	6.5	3.4
National Reform Party (Ghana)	Chris Arcman Ackumey	1,341	4.4	1.2
Independent	W/O (rtd.) Tetteh Kuwornu	217	0.7	—
EGLE	Richard Wornue	141	0.5	—
People's National Convention (Ghana)	Ferdinand Fiawoo Piccolo	100	0.3	−0.6
Independent	Jones Priam Wemegah	53	0.2	—
Majority		24,827	81.0	−6.7
Turnout		30,971	91.1	—
Registered electors		33,982		

Dan Abodakpi, MP for Keta constituency, who was also Minister for Trade and Industry in the NDC Rawlings government, was jailed by a Fast Track Court in Ghana for fraud.

2000 Ghanaian parliamentary election: Keta
Party	Candidate	Votes	%	±%
[[National Democratic Congress|NDC]]	Dan Abodakpi	25,090	90.9	—
National Reform Party (Ghana)	Chris Archmann-Ackummey	898	3.2	—
NPP	Emmanuel K. Vorkeh	847	3.1	—
CPP	Gladys Adzo Tsikpo	519	1.9	—
People's National Convention (Ghana)	Ferdinand Fiawoo-Piccolo	244	0.9	—
Majority		24,192	87.7	—
Registered electors		42,081		

== See also ==
- List of Ghana Parliament constituencies
