= Charles Sterling Acolatse =

Ghanaian judge (1899–1967)

Supreme Court Judge
- In office 1964–1965
- Nominated by: Dr. Kwame Nkrumah
- Succeeded by: G. S. Lassey

Personal details
- Born: 27 June 1899 Keta, Gold Coast
- Died: 25 September 1967 (aged 68)
- Education: Livingstone College; Cambridge University

Charles Acolatse Sterling was a Ghanaian lawyer and jurist. He was a barrister-at-law and later justice of the Supreme Court of Ghana.

== Early life and education ==
Charles was born on 27 June 1899 to Chief Joachim Acolatse of Keta in British Togoland (now the Volta Region of Ghana) and Catherine of Togo. At a young age he was adopted by the African Methodist Episcopal Missionaries to study in the United States of America. He studied at Livingstone College, Salisbury, North Carolina and continued at the University of Cambridge, England.

== Career ==
Charles was called to the bar at Lincoln's Inn on 7 January 1930 and enrolled as a barrister and solicitor by the then Chief Justice of the Gold Coast Colony Sir George Campbell Deane on 29 January 1931. He entered private legal practice and practised for twelve years. On 17 March 1943 he was appointed district magistrate and on 7 January 1952 he was promoted to puisne judge. In 1955 he was sent to Sierra Leone to serve on the Commission of Enquiry into the Strikes and Riots in Freetown. In 1964 he was appointed Supreme Court Judge. He served in this capacity until his retirement in 1965. He was replaced by Justice G. S. Lassey, who was formerly a jurist of the Cape Coast High Court.

== Personal life ==
Charles was married to Mary Adjuah Kuokor Vanderpuye, daughter of J. Addo Vanderpuye owner of Adawso Hotel. He enjoyed playing golf at his leisure time. He died on 25 September 1967.

== See also ==
- List of judges of the Supreme Court of Ghana
- Supreme Court of Ghana
