= Thérèse Striggner Scott =

Ghanaian lawyer and diplomat (1932–2021)

- Born: Thérèse Striggner; 29 October 1932
- Died: 5 September 2021 (aged 88); Ghana
- Occupations: Lawyer and diplomat
- Spouses: Emmanuel Kodjoe Dadzie, m. 1962–div. Kenneth Winky Scott, m. 1971–1982, his death

Thérèse Eppie Striggner Scott (29 October 1932 – 5 September 2021) was a Ghanaian lawyer and diplomat who served as a Judge on the High Court of Ghana, the High Court of Zimbabwe and as Ambassador of Ghana to France and Italy.

== Career ==
Striggner Scott was called to the bar in Middle Temple, United Kingdom. She worked as a barrister in Accra, where she was principal partner of a legal consulting firm.

Striggner Scott served on Ghana's High Court and in 1983 was the first woman appointed to the High Court of Zimbabwe.

Striggner Scott was Ghana's ambassador to France, including the Holy See, until 1994 and later ambassador to Italy. She was also Ghana's ambassador to UNESCO and served as a member of UNESCO's Legal Commission. In 1991, she became the first African woman to be appointed to UNESCO's executive board.

Striggner Scott was Chairperson of the Law Reform Commission of Ghana from 2000 until 2004. She was a member of the Standing Commission of Inquiry Regarding Public Violence and Intimidation in South Africa. She was a member of the Economic Community of West African States Council of Elders and in 2002 led a delegation to monitor Sierra Leone's parliamentary and presidential elections.

In 2004, Striggner Scott was appointed by UN Secretary General Kofi Annan to the five-member International Commission of Inquiry on Darfur.

== Personal life ==
In August 1961 Striggner Scott married her first husband, Emmanuel Kodjoe Dadzie, who at the time was head of the legal department at Ghana's Ministry of Foreign Affairs and who some months later was appointed Ambassador to Romania. Their daughter Geta (Georgetta) was born in 1962, and Striggner Scott also mothered Dadzie's other children, Yasmin, Stella, Barry, and Gary. After the marriage ended in divorce, in 1971 Striggner Scott married her second husband, Kenneth Winky Scott, a British architect living and working in Ghana.

She died in Ghana on 5 September 2021, aged 88.

== See also ==
- List of first women lawyers and judges in Africa
