= Alice Ivy Elliott =

Ballet teacher and choreographer

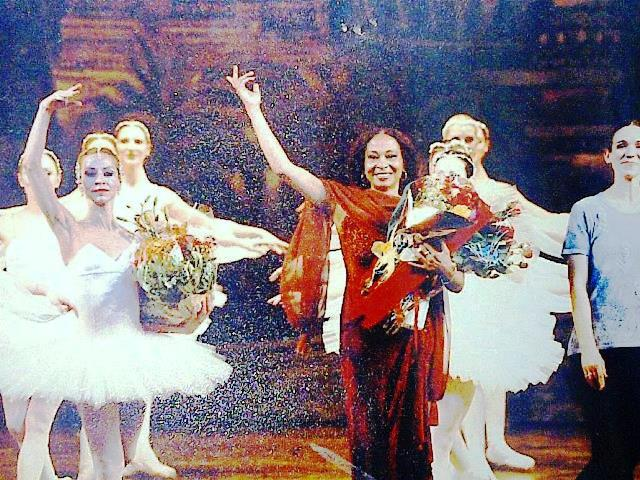
Alice Ivy Elliott at the Greek National Opera 2001.

Alice Ivy Elliott (14 October 1950 – 3 February 2015) was a ballet teacher and choreographer of Ghanaian descent.

== Early life ==
She was born into the royal household of the Omanhene of Sefwi Bekwai and given her cultural name Awuraba Ama Samma.

== Career ==
After a brief education in Ghana, she travelled with her father, John Banks Elliott, who served as Ghana’s first Ambassador to Moscow from 1960 to 1966. In Moscow, she joined the Bolshoi Ballet School, graduated as a ballet instructor, and performed several character parts at the Bolshoi Theatre.

After moving to the United Kingdom, Elliott worked with dance companies including the Redroofs Theatre School for the Performing Arts in Maidenhead, the Central School of Ballet in London, and Pineapple Dance Studios in Covent Garden. She later set up her own ballet school in Maidenhead. Later, while working in London, she earned a spot with The Australian Ballet, in addition to a contract to direct ballet in Melbourne, Australia.

During her career as a répétiteur, she worked with companies including Ballet Rambert, the American Ballet Theatre, Les Ballets de Monte Carlo, The Goteborg Opera & Ballet, La Scala Theatre Ballet, Hawaii State Ballet, Alberta Ballet Company, The Cairo Opera Ballet Company, Centro de Danza y Arte de Madrid, and Ballet British Columbia. Elliott's most prominent job was as a teacher at the Zurich Opera House, where she worked with the artistic director and choreographer Uwe Scholz.

She moved to Greece, where she staged her favorite ballet, Marius Petipa’s La Bayadère, for the Greek National Opera (2001) under the auspices of the Arts Council of Greece. The scene "The Kingdom of the Shades" was particularly acclaimed.
