= Dan Kwasi Abodakpi =

Ghanaian politician (born 1950)

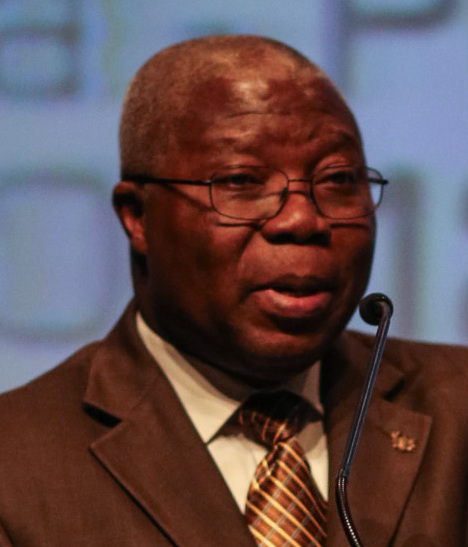
- Dan Abodakpi speaking at the 15th session of the UNIDO General Conference in Lima, 3 December 2013

Member of Ghana Parliament for Keta Constituency
- In office 7 January 1997 – 6 January 2009
- Succeeded by: Richard Lassey Agbenyefia

Minister of Trade and Industry
- In office January 2000 – 6 January 2001
- President: John Jerry Rawlings
- Preceded by: John Frank Abu
- Succeeded by: Kofi Konadu Apraku

Personal details
- Born: 27 February 1950 (age 76) Keta, Volta Region, Gold Coast (now Ghana)
- Party: National Democratic Congress
- Children: 7
- Education: University of Ghana
- Occupation: Politician
- Profession: Chemical engineer

Dan Kwasi Abodakpi (born 27 February 1950) is a Ghanaian politician and a member of the Fourth Parliament of the Fourth Republic of Ghana representing the Keta constituency in the Volta Region.

He served as the former Minister of Trade and Industry.

== Early life and education ==
Abodakpi was born in Keta in the Volta Region of Ghana on 27 February 1950. He attended the University of Pennsylvania and obtained a Doctor of Philosophy.

He also attended the University of Ghana and obtained his Bachelor of Science.

== Career ==
Abodakpi is a chemical engineer by profession and was a member of the Fourth Parliament of the Fourth Republic Of Ghana for the Keta Constituency from 1997 to 2009.

== Politics ==
Abodakpi is a member of the National Democratic Congress. He was elected into the first parliament of the fourth republic of Ghana on 7 January 1993 after he was pronounced winner at the 1992 Ghanaian parliamentary election held on 29 December 1992.

He was thereafter re-elected into the second parliament of the fourth republic of Ghana after the December 1996 Ghanaian General elections on the Ticket of the National Democratic Congress for the Keta Constituency in the Volta Region of Ghana.

=== 2000 Elections ===
Abodakpi was elected as the member of parliament for the Keta constituency in the 2000 Ghanaian general elections. He won the elections on the ticket of the National Democratic Congress.

His constituency was a part of the 17 parliamentary seats out of 19 seats won by the National Democratic Congress in that election for the Volta Region. The National Democratic Congress won a minority total of 92 parliamentary seats out of 200 seats in the 3rd parliament of the 4th republic of Ghana.

He was elected with 25,090 votes out of 27,853 total valid votes cast. This was equivalent to 90.9% of the total valid votes cast. He was elected over Chris Archmann-Ackummey of the National Reformed Party, Emmanuel K. Vorkeh of the New Patriotic Party, Gladys Adzo Tsikpo of the Convention People's Party and Ferdinanad Fiawoo-Piccolo of the People's National Convention. They obtained 898, 847, 519 and 244 votes respectively out of the total valid votes cast. These were equivalent to 3.3%, 3.1%, 1.9% and 0.9% respectively of total valid votes cast.

== Personal life ==
Abodakpi is a Christian. He has seven (7) children, five (5) girls and two (2) boys.
