= G. S. Lassey =

Ghanaian judge and author

Justice George Sewavi Lassey

Appeal Court Judge
- In office 1967–1980s
- Appointed by: Joseph Arthur Ankrah

Supreme Court Judge
- In office 1965–1966
- Nominated by: Kwame Nkrumah
- Preceded by: Charles Sterling Acolatse

High Court Judge
- In office 1 September 1962 – 1964
- President: Kwame Nkrumah

Personal details
- Born: Gold Coast
- Education: Mfantsipim School; University of London

George Sewavi Lassey was a Ghanaian judge. He served as a High Court Judge from 1962 to 1965, a Supreme Court Judge from 1965 to 1966 and an Appeals Court Judge from 1966 until his retirement.

== Early life and education ==
Lassey was born in Keta, a town in the Volta Region of Ghana to Moses Adjevi Lassey, a merchant of Keta. He had his secondary education at Achimota School where he studied under the tutelage of William Ofori Atta (who later became a member of The Big Six). He had his tertiary education at the University of London where he obtained his Bachelor of Laws degree (llb). He was called to the bar at Gray's Inn.

== Career ==
Prior to his appointment to the Supreme Court bench, he was a High Court judge stationed at Cape Coast. He served on the High Court bench from 1 September 1962 until 1965 when he was appointed to the Supreme Court bench to replace Justice Charles Sterling Acolatse who was due for retirement. In 1966, following the overthrow of Kwame Nkrumah by the National Liberation Council, the Supreme Court was replaced by the Appeals Court and Justice Lassey served as an Appeals Court Judge from 1966 until his retirement in the 1980s.

== See also ==
- List of judges of the Supreme Court of Ghana
- Supreme Court of Ghana
