= Richard Quashigah =

Ghanaian politician

Member of the Ghana Parliament for Keta
- In office 7 January 2013 – 6 January 2021
- Preceded by: Richard Agbenyefia-Lassey
- Succeeded by: Kwame Dzudzorli Gakpey

Personal details
- Born: Richard Mawuli Koku Quashigah; 16 October 1968 (age 57)
- Party: National Democratic Congress

Richard Mawuli Koku Quashigah (born 16 October 1968) is a Ghanaian politician and member of the Seventh Parliament of the Fourth Republic of Ghana representing the Keta Constituency in the Volta Region on the ticket of the National Democratic Congress.

== Personal life ==
Quashigah is married and has one child. He served as the NDC Member of Parliament for the Keta Constituency from 7 January 2013 to 7 January 2021. During his tenure, he was a member of both the Public Accounts Committee and the Communications Committee of Parliament. He also served as the Deputy Ranking on Parliament's Committee on Employment, Social Welfare and State Enterprises. He was also Vice Chairman of the Ghana-Korea Parliamentary Friendship Association. Quashigah is a Christian.

== Early life and education ==
Quashigah was born on 16 October 1968. He hails from Kedzi-Keta, a town in the Volta Region of Ghana. He had his secondary education at the Ghana Secondary Technical School(Takoradi). He entered University of Wales, Cardiff, UK and obtained his master's degree in International Journalism in 2002.

== Politics ==
Quashigah, the NDC Member of Parliament, Keta Constituency, since January 2013, is a member of the Public Accounts Committee as well as the Communications Committee of Parliament. He is also the Deputy Ranking on Parliament's Committee on Employment, Social Welfare and State Enterprises. He is also Vice Chairman of the Ghana/Korea Parliamentary Friendship Association.

Quashigah in January 2010 was elected as the National Propaganda Secretary of the NDC, serving a four-year term in that capacity; (that position is now designated as National Communication Officer. He proposed the motion for the change of name).

Earlier, Quashigah was the Greater Accra Regional Propaganda Secretary and has since the year 1996 through to 2006 been a member of the National Publicity Committee of the NDC. Subsequently, in 2007, Richard was a member and convener of the National Communications Committee of the NDC.

During the NDC campaign 2008, working to Madam Hannah Tetteh, Quashigah was in charge of building documentaries, T V commercials, media purchase and placement, media monitoring as well as scheduling of NDC spokespersons.

Quashigah has been and still is a member of the Keta Constituency of the NDC.
