= GlennSamm =

Ghanaian fashion model

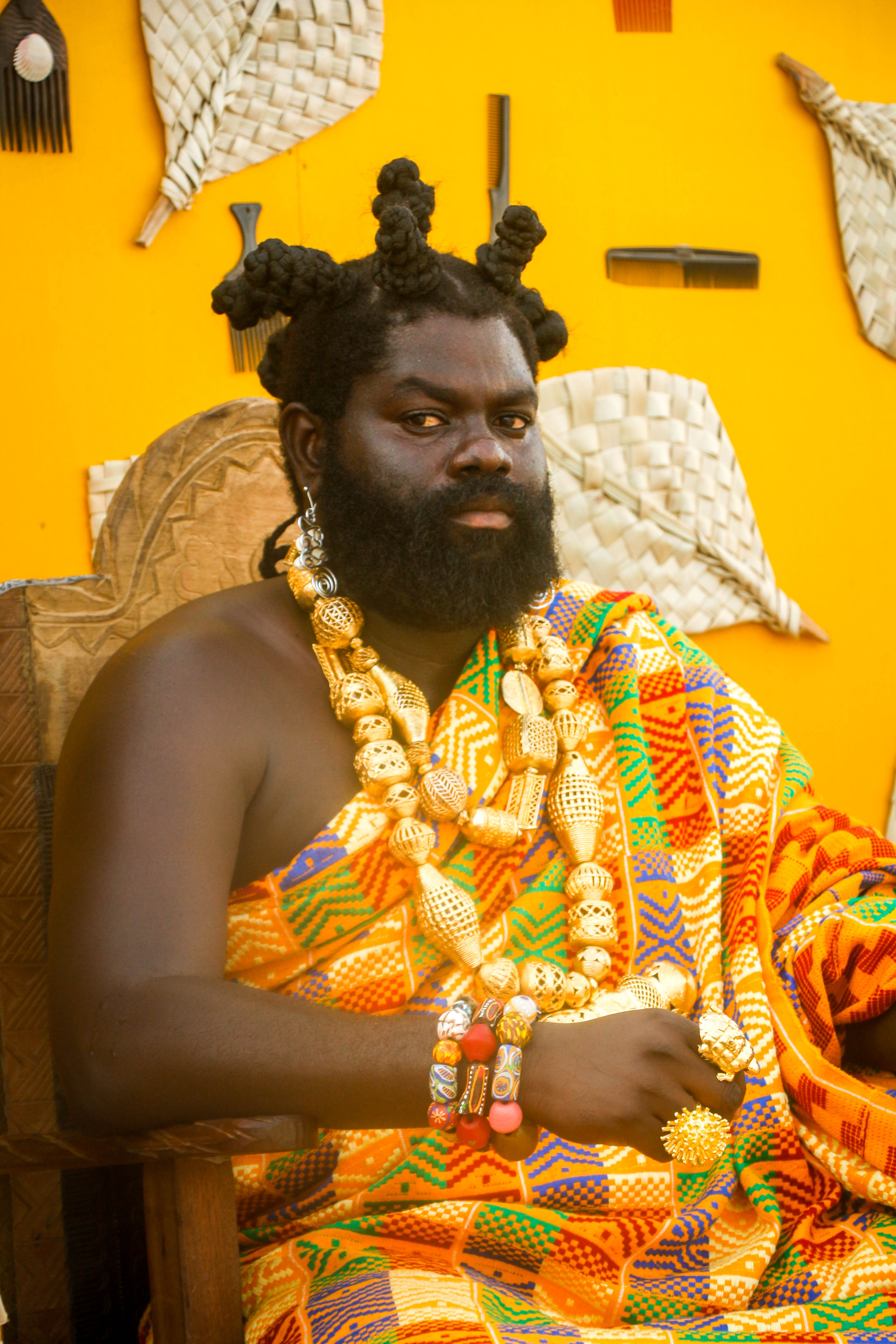
- GlennSamm at Afrochella
- Born: Samuel Glenn Semakor; Accra, Ghana
- Occupation: Fashion model
- Years active: 2013-present

Samuel Glenn Semakor, popularly known as GlennSamm, is a Ghanaian walking artiste and fashion model. After his appearance at the 2018 Afrochella Festival and the 2019 Chale Wote Festival, GlennSamm caught attention when he was featured in Vogue magazine and a BBC documentary.

== Early life and education ==
GlennSamm was born in Accra, schooled in Sogakofe Senior High School and Exopa Modelling School. He further studied Graphic Design at IPMC College of Technology. He belongs to the Anlo Ewe people from Keta.

== Career ==
GlennSamm was named "Fashion Personality of the Year" in 2019 at the Youth Excellence Awards. In 2019 he was appointed brand ambassador of Caveman watches. He was featured in the Vogue Magazine and has also starred in music videos including New African Girl from Fuse ODG and Every Day from Manuel NonBada. In November 2022, he launched the maiden edition of the Tsadidi Street Art Festival in Keta.

During the Stop Galamsey Now Protest, he was arrested along with 51 other protestors.

== Discography ==
- Africa (feat. Kamo Smash)
