= Esi Buobasa =

Ghanaian fishmonger

- Known for: Community activism, climate activism
- Awards: 100 Women (BBC)

Esi Buobasa (Fuveme, Ghana) is a Ghanaian fishmonger, environmental migrant, and climate activist.

In 2023, Buobasa was distinguished as one of the most influential women in the world according to the 100 Women (BBC) for her efforts to build resilience against climate change.

== Career ==
Buobasa was born and raised in Fuveme, a coastal village near Keta. Between 2000 and 2010, the territory, located between Keta Lagoon and the Gulf of Guinea, eroded to practically a thin line of sand due to the rising sea level. The town also is periodically flooded by the Volta River.

The loss of buildings and increasingly frequent cyclones and floods forced Buobasa, a fisherman, with her husband and five children, to migrate inland and recreate their lives. However, this deprived the family of their main source of income: fishing.

To mitigate the socioeconomic impacts of the environmental migration, Buobasa founded an association to support female fishermen in her circumstance. The alliance sought to train them for other jobs and provide economic recovery. It also provided a resistance fund to finance damage or loss of income due to further storms or climate disaster. Buobasa's leadership led to her inclusion in BBC's 2023 list of 100 Women (BBC).
