= International Commission of Inquiry on Darfur =

United Nations investigation commission

The following is a summary of a public report. The full report can be found on the United Nations website listed in the external links.

The International Commission of Inquiry on Darfur (henceforth the Commission) was established pursuant to United Nations Security Council Resolution 1564 (2004), adopted on 18 September 2004. The resolution, passed under Chapter VII of the United Nations Charter, urged the Secretary-General to set up an international commission to investigate human rights violations committed in Darfur. The following month, the Secretary-General appointed a five-member panel of highly regarded legal experts: chairperson Antonio Cassese, Mohammed Fayek, Hina Jilani, Dumisa Ntsebeza and Thérèse Striggner Scott.

The Secretary-General decided that the Commission’s staff would be provided by the Office of the High Commissioner for Human Rights. Ms Mona Rishmawi was appointed Executive Director of the Commission and head of its staff. The Commission assembled in Geneva and began its work on 25 October 2004. The Secretary-General requested that the Commission report to him within three months, i.e. by 25 January 2005.

== Details ==
Acting under Chapter VII of the United Nations Charter, on 18 September 2004 the Security Council adopted Resolution 1564 requesting, inter alia, that the Secretary-General ‘rapidly establish an international commission of inquiry in order immediately to investigate reports of violations of international humanitarian law and human rights law in Darfur by all parties, to determine also whether or not acts of genocide have occurred, and to identify the perpetrators of such violations with a view to ensuring that those responsible are held accountable’.

In October 2004, the Secretary General appointed Antonio Cassese (Chairperson), Mohamed Fayek, Hina Jilani, Dumisa Ntsebeza and Therese Striggner-Scott as members of the Commission and requested that they report back on their findings within three months. The Commission was supported in its work by a Secretariat headed by an Executive Director, Ms. Mona Rishmawi, as well as a legal research team and an investigative team composed of investigators, forensic experts, military analysts, and investigators specializing in gender violence, all appointed by the Office of the United Nations High Commissioner for Human Rights. The Commission assembled in Geneva and began its work on 25 October 2004.

In order to discharge its mandate, the Commission endeavored to fulfill four key tasks: (1) to investigate reports of violations of international humanitarian law and human rights law in Darfur by all parties; (2) to determine whether or not acts of genocide have occurred; (3) to identify the perpetrators of violations of international humanitarian law and human rights law in Darfur; and (4) to suggest means of ensuring that those responsible for such violations are held accountable. While the Commission considered all events relevant to the current conflict in Darfur, it focused in particular on incidents that occurred between February 2003 and mid-January 2005.

The Commission engaged in a regular dialogue with the Government of the Sudan throughout its mandate, in particular through meetings in Geneva and in the Sudan, as well as through the work of its investigative team. The Commission visited the Sudan from 7–21 November 2004 and 9–16 January 2005, including travel to the three Darfur States. The investigative team remained in Darfur from November 2004 through January 2005. During its presence in the Sudan, the Commission held extensive meetings with representatives of the Government, the Governors of the Darfur States and other senior officials in the capital and at provincial and local levels, members of the armed forces and police, leaders of rebel forces, tribal leaders, internally displaced persons, victims and witnesses of violations, NGOs and United Nations representatives.

The Commission submitted a full report on its findings to the Secretary-General on 25 January 2005. The report describes the terms of reference, methodology, approach and activities of the Commission and its investigative team. It also provides an overview of the historical and social background to the conflict in Darfur. The report then addresses in detail the four key tasks referred to above, namely the Commission’s findings in relation to: i) violations of international human rights and humanitarian law by all parties; ii) whether or not acts of genocide have taken place; iii) the identification of perpetrators; and iv) accountability mechanisms. These four sections are briefly summarized below.

=== Violations of international human rights law and international humanitarian law ===
In accordance with its mandate to ‘investigate reports of violations of human rights law and international humanitarian law’, the Commission carefully examined reports from different sources including Governments, inter-governmental organizations, United Nations bodies and mechanisms, as well as non-governmental organizations.

The Commission took as the starting point for its work two irrefutable facts regarding the situation in Darfur. Firstly, according to United Nations estimates there are 1,65 million internally displaced persons in Darfur, and more than 200,000 refugees from Darfur in neighbouring Chad. Secondly, there has been large-scale destruction of villages throughout the three states of Darfur. The Commission conducted independent investigations to establish additional facts and gathered extensive information on multiple incidents of violations affecting villages, towns and other locations across North, South and West Darfur. The conclusions of the Commission are based on the evaluation of the facts gathered or verified through its investigations.

Based on a thorough analysis of the information gathered in the course of its investigations, the Commission established that the Government of the Sudan and the Janjaweed are responsible for serious violations of international human rights and humanitarian law amounting to crimes under international law. In particular, the Commission found that Government forces and militias conducted indiscriminate attacks, including killing of civilians, torture, enforced disappearances, destruction of villages, rape and other forms of sexual violence, pillaging and forced displacement, throughout Darfur. These acts were conducted on a widespread and systematic basis, and therefore may amount to crimes against humanity. The extensive destruction and displacement have resulted in a loss of livelihood and means of survival for countless women, men and children. In addition to the large scale attacks, many people have been arrested and detained, and many have been held incommunicado for prolonged periods and tortured. The vast majority of the victims of all of these violations have been from the Fur, Zaghawa, Massalit, Jebel, Aranga and other so-called ‘African’ tribes.

In their discussions with the Commission, Government of the Sudan officials stated that any attacks carried out by Government armed forces in Darfur were for counter-insurgency purposes and were conducted on the basis of military imperatives. However, it is clear from the Commission’s findings that most attacks were deliberately and indiscriminately directed against civilians. Moreover, even if rebels, or persons supporting rebels, were present in some of the villages – which the Commission considers likely in only a very small number of instances - the attackers did not take precautions to enable civilians to leave the villages or otherwise be shielded from attack. Even where rebels may have been present in villages, the impact of the attacks on civilians shows that the use of military force was manifestly disproportionate to any threat posed by the rebels.

The Commission is particularly alarmed that attacks on villages, killing of civilians, rape, pillaging and forced displacement have continued during the course of the Commission’s mandate. The Commission considers that action must be taken urgently to end these violations.

While the Commission did not find a systematic or a widespread pattern to these violations, it found credible evidence that rebel forces, namely members of the SLM and JEM, also are responsible for serious violations of international human rights and humanitarian law which may amount to war crimes. In particular, these violations include cases of murder of civilians and pillage.

=== Have acts of genocide occurred? ===
The Commission concluded that the Government of the Sudan has not pursued a policy of genocide. Arguably, two elements of genocide might be deduced from the gross violations of human rights perpetrated by Government forces and the militias under their control. These two elements are, first, the actus reus consisting of killing, or causing serious bodily or mental harm, or deliberately inflicting conditions of life likely to bring about physical destruction; and, second, on the basis of a subjective standard, the existence of a protected group being targeted by the authors of criminal conduct. However, the crucial element of genocidal intent appears to be missing, at least as far as the central Government authorities are concerned. Generally speaking the policy of attacking, killing and forcibly displacing members of some tribes does not evince a specific intent to annihilate, in whole or in part, a group distinguished on racial, ethnic, national or religious grounds. Rather, it would seem that those who planned and organized attacks on villages pursued the intent to drive the victims from their homes, primarily for purposes of counter-insurgency warfare.

The Commission does recognize that in some instances individuals, including Government officials, may commit acts with genocidal intent. Whether this was the case in Darfur, however, is a determination that only a competent court can make on a case by case basis.

The conclusion that no genocidal policy has been pursued and implemented in Darfur by the Government authorities, directly or through the militias under their control, should not be taken in any way as detracting from the gravity of the crimes perpetrated in that region. International offences such as the crimes against humanity and war crimes that have been committed in Darfur may be no less serious and heinous than genocide.

=== Identification of perpetrators ===
The Commission has collected reliable and consistent elements which indicate the responsibility of some individuals for serious violations of international human rights law and international humanitarian law, including crimes against humanity or war crimes, in Darfur. In order to identify perpetrators, the Commission decided that there must be ‘a reliable body of material consistent with other verified circumstances, which tends to show that a person may reasonably be suspected of being involved in the commission of a crime.’ The Commission therefore makes an assessment of likely suspects, rather than a final judgment as to criminal guilt.

Those identified as possibly responsible for the above-mentioned violations consist of individual perpetrators, including officials of the Government of Sudan, members of militia forces, members of rebel groups, and certain foreign army officers acting in their personal capacity. Some Government officials, as well as members of militia forces, have also been named as possibly responsible for joint criminal enterprise to commit international crimes. Others are identified for their possible involvement in planning and/or ordering the commission of international crimes, or of aiding and abetting the perpetration of such crimes. The Commission also has identified a number of senior Government officials and military commanders who may be responsible, under the notion of superior (or command) responsibility, for knowingly failing to prevent or repress the perpetration of crimes. Members of rebel groups are named as suspected of participating in a joint criminal enterprise to commit international crimes, and as possibly responsible for knowingly failing to prevent or repress the perpetration of crimes committed by rebels.

The Commission has decided to withhold the names of these persons from the public domain. This decision is based on three main grounds: 1) the importance of the principles of due process and respect for the rights of the suspects; 2) the fact that the Commission has not been vested with investigative or prosecutorial powers; and 3) the vital need to ensure the protection of witnesses from possible harassment or intimidation. The Commission instead will list the names in a sealed file that will be placed in the custody of the UN Secretary-General. The Commission recommends that this file be handed over to a competent Prosecutor (the Prosecutor of the International Criminal Court, according to the Commission’s recommendations), who will use that material as he or she deems fit for his or her investigations. A distinct and very voluminous sealed file, containing all the evidentiary material collected by the Commission, will be handed over to the High Commissioner for Human Rights. This file should be delivered to a competent Prosecutor.

=== Accountability mechanisms ===
The Commission strongly recommends that the Security Council immediately refer the situation of Darfur to the International Criminal Court, pursuant to article 13(b) of the ICC Statute. As repeatedly stated by the Security Council, the situation constitutes a threat to international peace and security. Moreover, as the Commission has confirmed, serious violations of international human rights law and humanitarian law by all parties are continuing. The prosecution by the ICC of persons allegedly responsible for the most serious crimes in Darfur would contribute to the restoration of peace in the region.

The alleged crimes that have been documented in Darfur meet the thresholds of the Rome Statute as defined in articles 7 (1), 8 (1) and 8 (f). There is an internal armed conflict in Darfur between the governmental authorities and organized armed groups. A body of reliable information indicates that war crimes may have been committed on a large-scale, at times even as part of a plan or a policy. There is also a wealth of credible material which suggests that criminal acts were committed as part of widespread or systematic attacks directed against the civilian population, with knowledge of the attacks. In the opinion of the Commission therefore, these may amount to crimes against humanity.

The Sudanese justice system is unable and unwilling to address the situation in Darfur. This system has been significantly weakened during the last decade. Restrictive laws that grant broad powers to the executive have undermined the effectiveness of the judiciary, and many of the laws in force in Sudan today contravene basic human rights standards. Sudanese criminal laws do not adequately proscribe war crimes and crimes against humanity, such as those carried out in Darfur, and the Criminal Procedure Code contains provisions that prevent the effective prosecution of these acts. In addition, many victims informed the Commission that they had little confidence in the impartiality of the Sudanese justice system and its ability to bring to justice the perpetrators of the serious crimes committed in Darfur. In any event, many have feared reprisals in the event that they resort to the national justice system.

The measures taken so far by the Government to address the crisis have been both grossly inadequate and ineffective, which has contributed to the climate of almost total impunity for human rights violations in Darfur. Very few victims have lodged official complaints regarding crimes committed against them or their families, due to a lack of confidence in the justice system. Of the few cases where complaints have been made, most have not been properly pursued. Furthermore, procedural hurdles limit the victims’ access to justice. Despite the magnitude of the crisis and its immense impact on civilians in Darfur, the Government informed the Commission of very few cases of individuals who have been prosecuted, or even disciplined, in the context of the current crisis.

The Commission considers that the Security Council must act not only against the perpetrators but also on behalf of the victims. It therefore recommends the establishment of a Compensation Commission designed to grant reparation to the victims of the crimes, whether or not the perpetrators of such crimes have been identified.

It further recommends a number of serious measures to be taken by the Government of the Sudan, in particular (i) ending the impunity for the war crimes and crimes against humanity committed in Darfur; (ii) strengthening the independence and impartiality of the judiciary, and empowering courts to address human rights violations; (iii) granting full and unimpeded access by the International Committee of the Red Cross and United Nations human rights monitors to all those detained in relation to the situation in Darfur; (iv) ensuring the protection of all the victims and witnesses of human rights violations; (v) enhancing the capacity of the Sudanese judiciary through the training of judges, prosecutors and lawyers; (vi) respecting the rights of IDPs and fully implementing the Guiding Principles on Internal Displacement, particularly with regard to facilitating the voluntary return of IDPs in safety and dignity; (vii) fully cooperating with the relevant human rights bodies and mechanisms of the United Nations and the African Union; and (viii) creating, through a broad consultative process, a truth and reconciliation commission once peace is established in Darfur.

The Commission also recommends a number of measures to be taken by other bodies to help break the cycle of impunity. These include the exercise of universal jurisdiction by other States, re-establishment by the Commission on Human Rights of the mandate of the Special Rapporteur on human rights in Sudan, and public and periodic reports on the human rights situation in Darfur by the High Commissioner for Human Rights.
