= Kwame Dzudzorli Gakpey =

Ghanaian politician

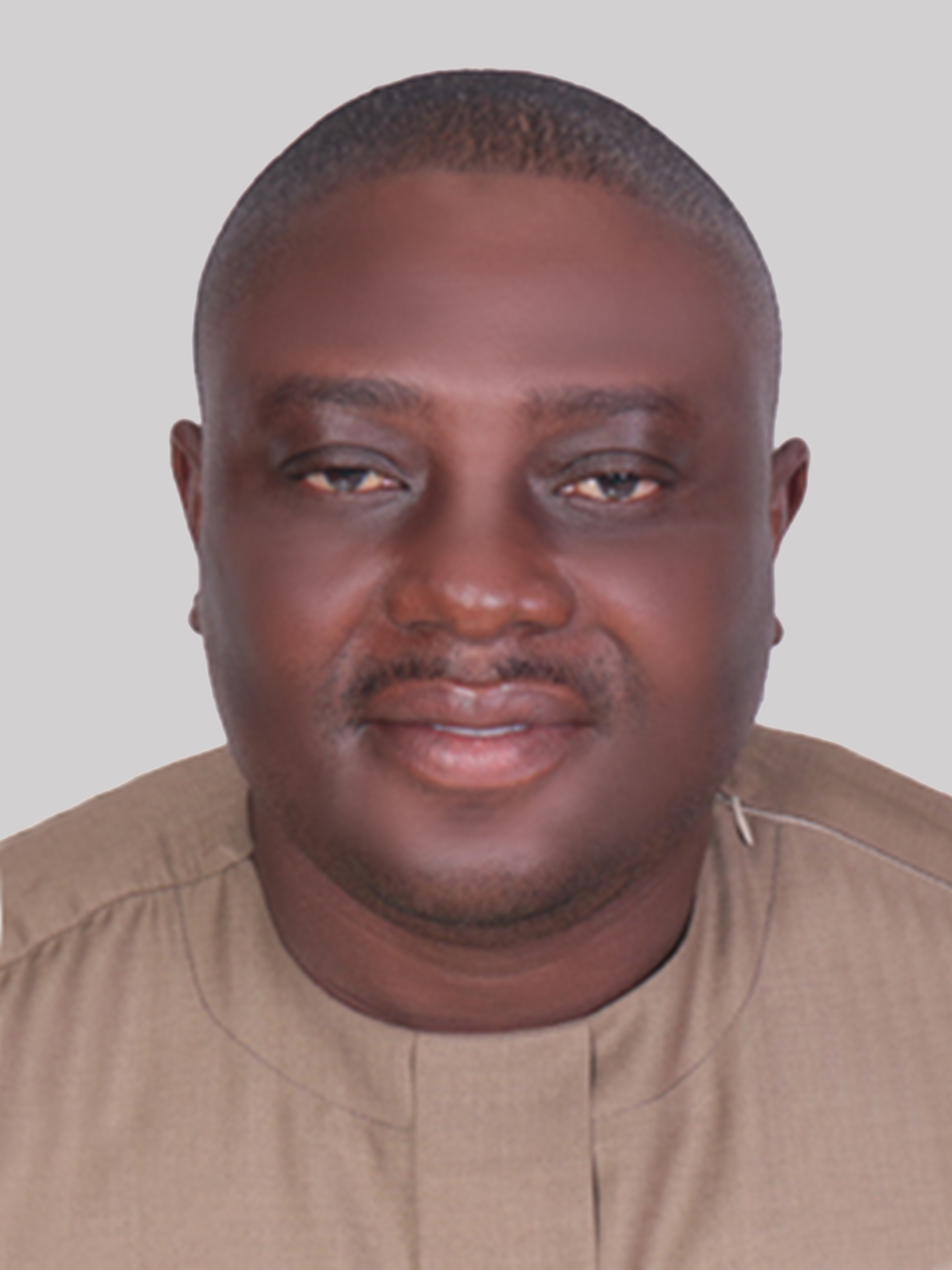

Member of the Ghana Parliament for Keta
- Incumbent
- Assumed office 7 January 2021
- Preceded by: Richard Quashigah
- Majority: 26,433

Personal details
- Born: 28 June 1975 (age 51)
- Party: National Democratic Congress
- Committees: Food, Agriculture and Cocoa Affairs Committee; Members Holding Offices of Profit Committee
- Website: Parliament webpage

Kwame Dzudzorli Gakpey is a Ghanaian politician and member of the Ninth Parliament of the Fourth Republic of Ghana representing the Keta Constituency in the Volata Region of Ghana on the ticket of the National Democratic Congress.

== Early life and education ==
Gakpey completed his Basic Education Certificate Examination (BECE) in 1990 and the Senior School Certificate Examination (SSCE) in 1993. He obtained a diploma in shipping and export management in 1998 and a post graduate diploma in marketing in 2003. He proceeded to complete various health courses after his secondary education leading to certificates in Health Social Sciences for Research, Leadership in strategic Health management, Malaria planning and management and Parasitic disease management between 2004 and 2016. He also has a degree in public health.

== Politics ==
=== 2020 elections ===
In December 2020, Gakpey stood for the Keta constituency seat in the 2020 Ghanaian general election on the National Democratic Congress ticket. This followed the decision of the incumbent MP, Richard Quashigah who was one of eleven MPs who decided to retire from parliament. He won the seat with a majority of 72.1%. He sits on the Food, Agriculture and Cocoa Affairs Committee as well as the Members Holding Offices of Profit Committee in parliament.

=== 2024 elections ===
Gakpey contested and won the 2024 NDC parliamentary primaries for Keta Constituency in the Volta Region of Ghana. Gakpey won in the 2024 Ghanaian general elections on the ticket of the National Democratic Congress with 29,471 votes (91.18%) against Courage Hope Goldberg-Grimm Lekettey of the New Patriotic Party who had 2,850 votes (8.82%), both Yayra Kwashie Kwawu of LPG and Dugah Stanley Courage who is an independent candidate had 0 votes (0.00%) to join the 9th Parliament of the Fourth Republic of Ghana.

== Philanthropy ==
In January 2022, he sponsored a youth apprenticeship programme in the constituency.

== Attacks and Controversies ==
He has been the victim of two armed attacks. The first was in December 2020 and the second in January 2021. He believed these were targeted and not random attacks. Three persons went on trial for the first assault in December 2020.

== Personal life ==
Kwame Dzudzorli Gakpey is a Christian.
