= John Banks Elliott =

Ghanaian diplomat and statesman (1917–2018)

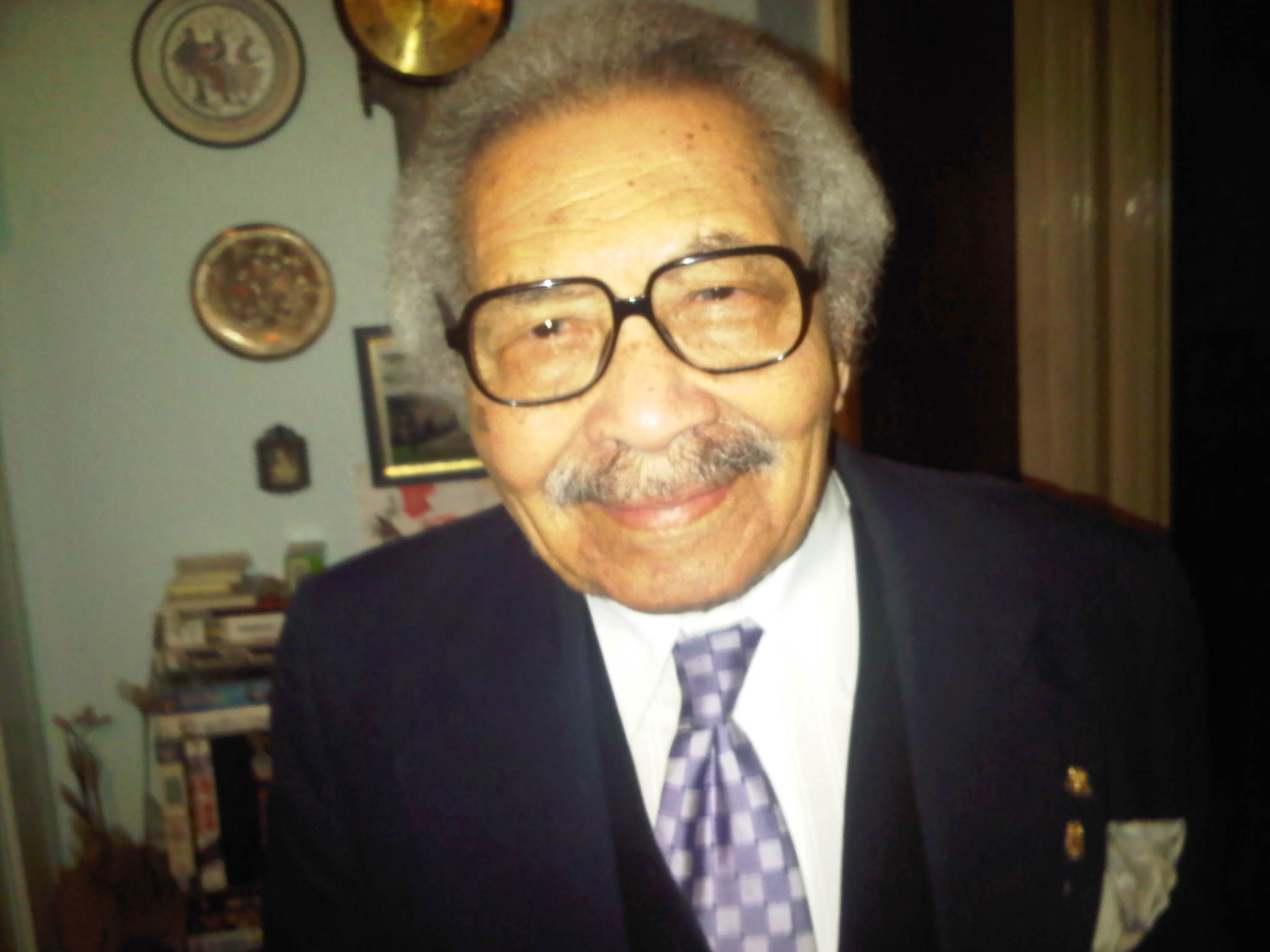
- Elliott, February 2012

Ghanaian Ambassador to the Soviet Union
- In office 1960–1967
- President: Kwame Nkrumah

Personal details
- Born: 9 February 1917 Cape Coast, Gold Coast (now Ghana)
- Died: 18 July 2018 (aged 101) Ghana

John Banks Elliott (9 February 1917 – 18 July 2018) was a Ghanaian diplomat and statesman. He was Ghana's first Ambassador Extraordinary and Plenipotentiary to the Soviet Union, serving from 1960 to 1966.

== Early life ==
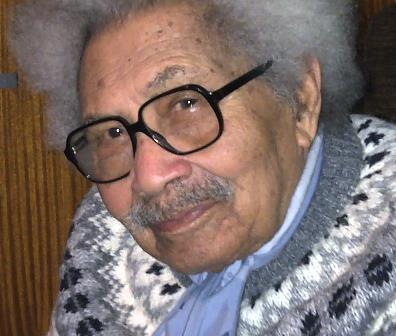
Banks in 2014

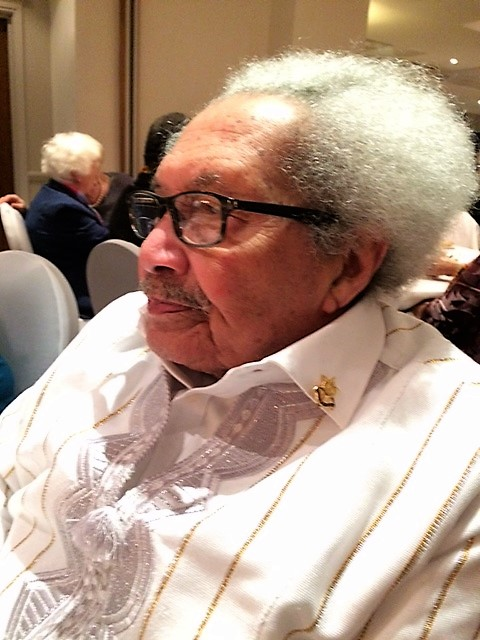
John Banks Elliott at his Centenary celebration on 12 February 2017

Born in 1917 to Gerald Barton Elliott, a lawyer and auctioneer at large, and Mary Wood-Elliott, a sacristan, he was named after his grandfather who came to the Gold Coast as a timber merchant with attention to detail; one of his passions was photography, J. Banks Elliott's photographs of the Gold Coast showing trading stations, factories, towns, markets and people taken in 1880-1890 are archived at the Bodleian Library of Commonwealth and African Studies, Rhodes House, Oxford.

== Career ==
During his tenure, he was Dean of the Diplomatic Corps, Head of Commonwealth Ambassadors, Head of African and Asian Diplomats, and Head of the African Ambassadors Group. His appointment as ambassador designate to the USSR was announced in Moscow on 8 January 1960, and commented on in the Central Intelligence Agency bulletin of 12 January 1960. During the 1963 Moscow protest he requested Militsiya protection for the Ghanaian embassy and suggested that students involved in the protest were being instigated by Western embassies.

His accreditation to the Soviet Union was directed by the last Governor-General of the Dominion of Ghana, the Earl of Listowel, William Francis Hare under the direction of Queen Elizabeth II. Ambassador John Banks Elliott presented his first credentials to the then Chairman of the Presidium of the Supreme Soviet Kliment Voroshilov On 1 July 1960, Ghana became an independent republic within the Commonwealth, and the first President of the Republic of Ghana Kwame Nkrumah reaccredited his appointment, which he presented to the Chairman of the Presidium of the Supreme Council Leonid Brezhnev.

Elliott turned 100 on 9 February 2017.

== Personal life ==
In 1950, his daughter Alice Ivy Elliott was born in the Gold Coast. She was a ballet teacher and choreographer.

== See also ==
- John Aglionby (bishop)
