= 1963 Moscow protest =

Protests by African students on Red Square

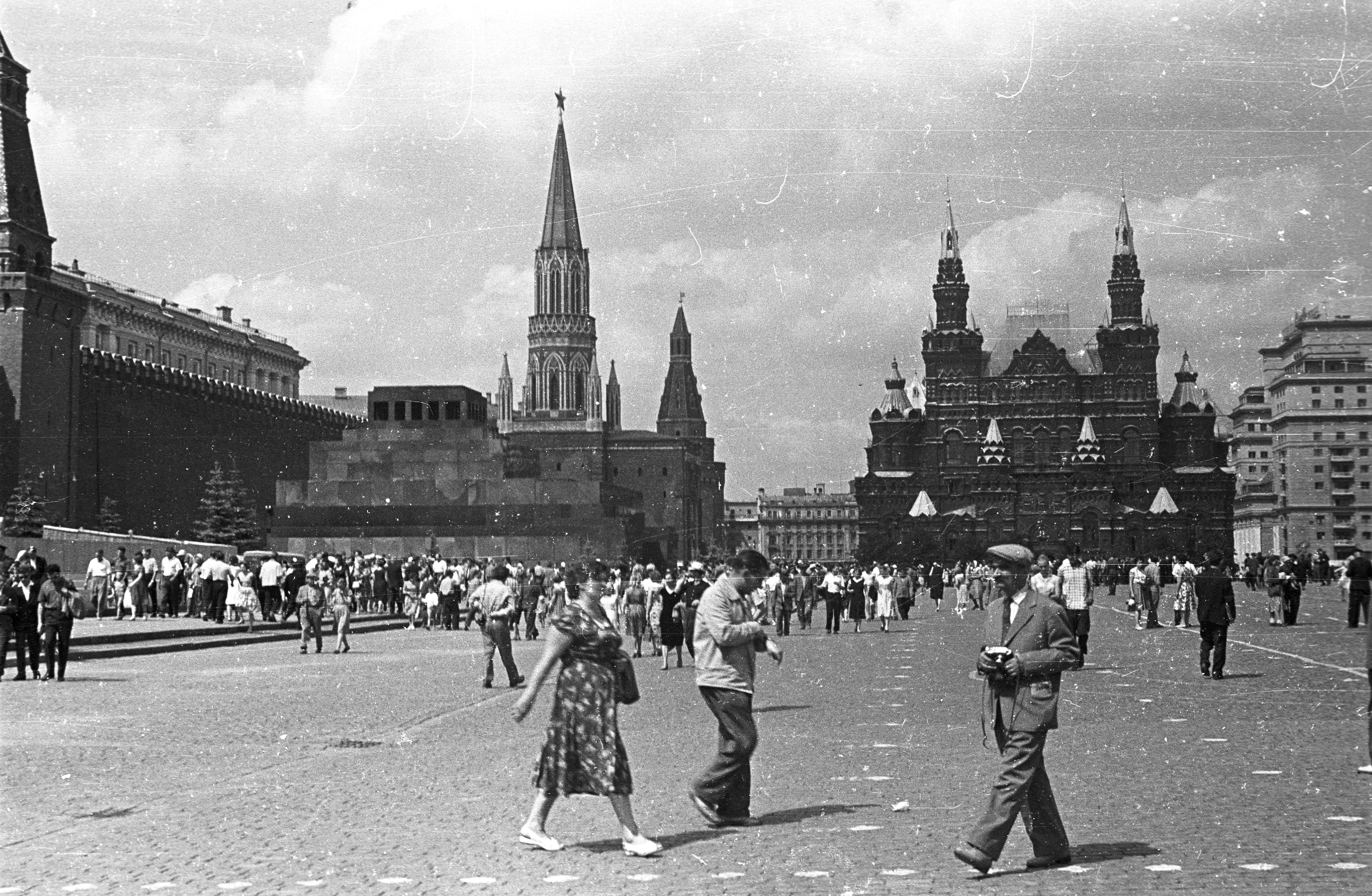
- Red Square, the location of the protest, in 1963
- Date: 18 December 1963
- Location: Red Square, Moscow, Russian SFSR
- Type: Protest
- Cause: The alleged murder of the medical student Edmund Assare-Addo
- Participants: Students from Ghana and other African countries

On 18 December 1963, a number of students from Ghana and other African countries organized a protest on Moscow's Red Square (Russian SFSR, USSR) in response to the alleged murder of the medical student Edmund Assare-Addo. The number of participants was reported at 500–700, but the Ghanaian physician Edward Na, who participated in the protests, claimed there were at most 150 protesters. The ambassador of Ghana in the Soviet Union, John Banks Elliott, requested militsiya protection of the Ghanaian embassy following the allegations of attacks by the protesters.

This was the first recorded political protest on the Red Square since the late 1920s.

== Background ==
Edmund Assare-Addo was a 29-year-old student of the Kalinin Medical Institute in the town of Kalinin (now Tver) 180 kilometres (110 mi) north of Moscow. His body was found in a stretch of wasteland just north of Moscow along a country road leading to the Moscow Ring Road. Other African students residing in Moscow alleged that Assare-Addo was stabbed by a Soviet man because he was planning to propose to a Russian woman. They claimed that a student was very unlikely to venture into a place that desolate and remote by himself, especially in a town far away from where he lived. The Soviet authorities stated that Assare-Addo froze to death in the snow while intoxicated. According to the autopsy, performed by Soviet medics with two advanced medical students from Ghana as observers, the death was "an effect of cold in a state of alcohol-induced stupor". No signs of physical trauma were found, with the possible exception of a small scar on the neck.

Discussing the protest with Soviet officials, John Banks Elliott claimed officials stationed at the Western embassies in Moscow ("the U.S., England, France, West Germany, or even the Netherlands") were probably involved in instigating the protestors. He went so far as to suggest that Ghanaian students who "behaved poorly" and "skipped class" should be deported from the Soviet Union. Before the students' march to the Red Square, Elliott claimed that the students broke into the Ghanaian embassy and damaged furniture and pictures following the news of Assare-Addo's death.

== Protest ==
The protesters were African students studying at Soviet universities and institutes. Having assembled on the morning of 18 December 1963, they wrote a memorandum to present to Soviet authorities. The protesters carried placards with the slogans "Moscow – center of discrimination", "Stop killing Africans!" and "Moscow, a second Alabama", while shouting in English, Russian, and French. The protesters marched to the Spasskiye Gates of the Kremlin, where they posed for photographs and gave interviews to Western correspondents. The Soviet TASS news agency responded with a statement: "It is to be regretted that the meetings of the Ghanaian students which began in connection with their claims to the embassy of their country resulted in the disturbance of public order in Moscow streets. It is quite natural that this is resented by the Russian people".

On 20 December, the students returned to classes and the militsiya ceased the protection of the Ghanaian embassy.
