= Epiphan Patrick Komla Seddoh =

Ghanaian diplomat

Epiphan Patrick Komla Sedoh
- Died: 23 October 2019

Epiphan Patrick Komla Seddoh (January 6, 1925 – March 8, 2019) was a Ghanaian diplomat.

== Early life ==
Epiphan Patrick Komla Seddoh, born to Elizabeth Kwamba Seddoh (born Byll-Cataria) and Aloysius Komi Seddoh, received his baptism in Keta on February 30, 1926. Between 1930 and 1941, Epiphan Patrick Komla Seddoh went to a Roman Catholic school in Keta, where he obtained the Standard Seven School Leaving Certificate, which normally consists of at least seven subjects. From 1941 to 1943, Epiphan Patrick Komla Seddoh assisted his father, who was an agent of G. B. Ollivant, a subsidiary of Unilever, and the United Africa Company of Nigeria.

== Diplomatic career ==
Epiphan Patrick Komla Seddoh served as ambassador from 1967 to 1969 in Paris, where he was also admitted to Madrid and to the European Economic Community (EEC). Thereafter, from October 16, 1970, to 1972, he held the post of ambassador to The Hague, and obtained a license in Brussels. Continuing his diplomatic career, from 1972 to 1976, he served as ambassador to Paris.

Between 1976 and 1979, Epiphan Patrick Komla Seddoh assumed the post of Chief Executive Secretary in the Ministry of Koko Affairs in Accra, where he held the position of Executive Secretary.

== Death ==
Patrick Seddoh died on March 8, 2019, at Nyaho Medical Center.
