= Cape St. Paul Lighthouse =

Lighthouse in Ghana

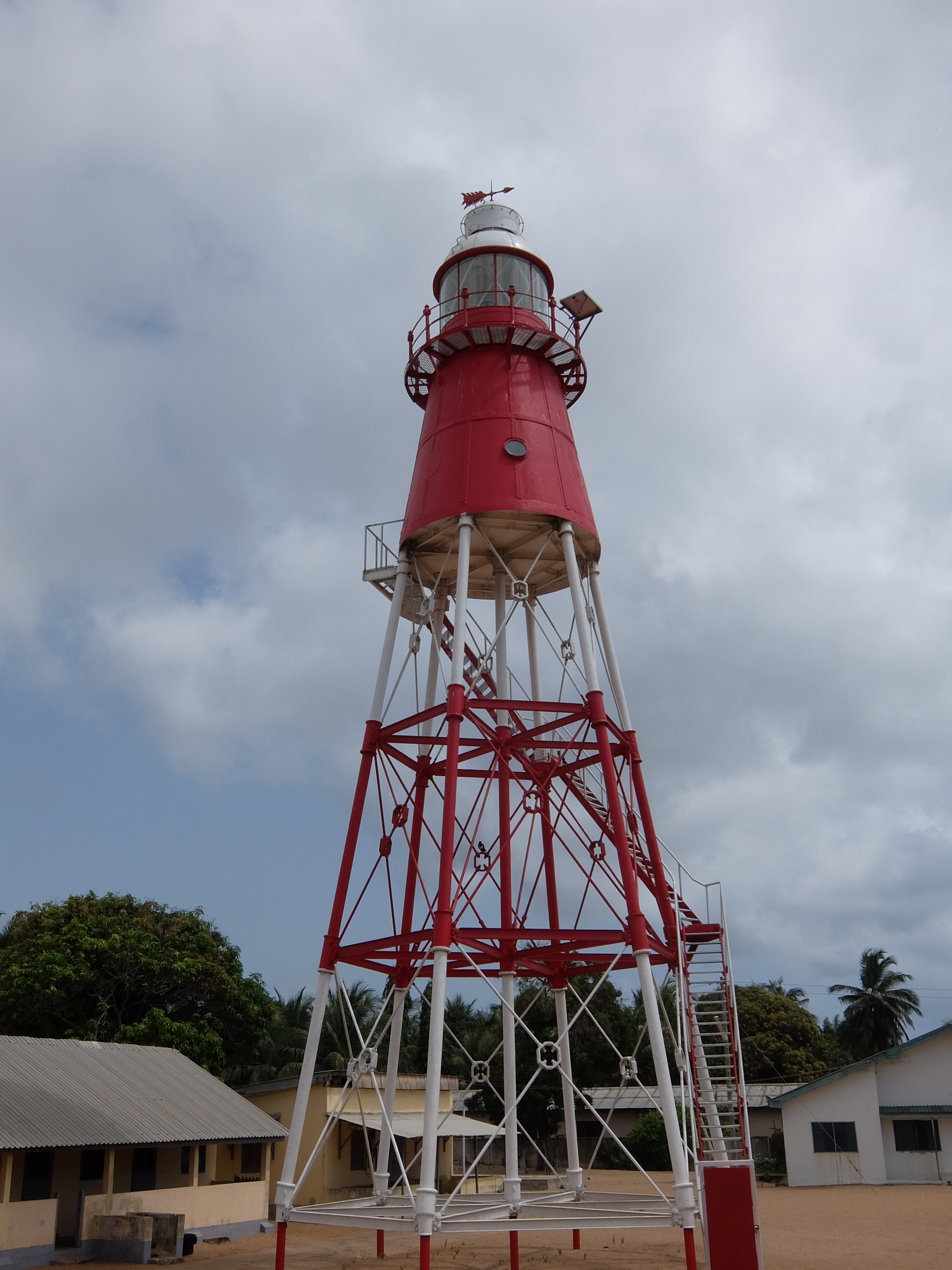
- Location: Woe, Ghana
- Coordinates: 5°49′40″N 0°58′10″E

Tower
- Constructed: 1901

The Cape St. Paul Lighthouse was built in 1901 near Woe, Ghana.

It has a skeletal pyramidal base with the upper third enclosed and housing the lantern and gallery.

== See also ==
- List of lighthouses in Ghana
