= Woe, Ghana =

Woe
- Location in Ghana
- Coordinates: 5°50′N 0°58′E
- Country: Ghana
- Region: Volta Region

Woe (pronounced Wo-ay) is a small rural town in Ghana's Volta region near the larger town of Keta. Woe's economy relies heavily on fishing. The predominant local language of Woe is Ewe, with the population predominantly of the Ewe tribe. A notable landmark there is a large lighthouse called Cape St. Paul Lighthouse on the beach that guides ships away from a mythical massive underwater mountain. This lighthouse is also thought to be the oldest in Ghana.

== Location and description ==
Woe is located on the coast of Ghana, in the eastern part of the country close to the border with Togo. The town is situated on a narrow spit of land between the Keta Lagoon to the north and the Atlantic Ocean to the south. It is part of the municipality of Keta, the principal town of Keta lying on the same spit of land to the north and east of Woe.

== Economy ==
Woe's economy relies heavily on fishing, with both the lagoon and the ocean being exploited by the town's fishermen. There is also agriculture in the area, carried out without machinery on the local sand-based soil. Among the principal foods consumed in the area are yams, rice and cassava.

== Infrastructure ==
The red-and-white Cape St. Paul Lighthouse is found in Woe. Constructed in 1901 and restored in 2017, it has an octagonal metal frame which narrows at the top and an enclosed top section. The lighthouse was built to protect ships from an area off the shore where they could run aground, which local sources describe as a "big submerged mountain". This lighthouse is also thought to be the oldest in Ghana.

== Demographics ==
As of 2015, Woe had a population of 56,973, of whom 26,459 were male and 30,514 female. This was up from a 1962 population of 3,450. The median age in 2015 was 20.8 years. The population is predominantly of the Ewe people, with 98.7% of people emanating from that tribe in the wider Keta municipality. Keta is 72.8% Christian and 25.4% traditional religion, with only a small minority from Islam and other faiths. The predominant language of the town is the Anlo-Ewe dialect of the Ewe language.
