= Richard Lassey Agbenyefia =

Ghanaian politician

Richard Agbenyefia-Lassey

Member of the Ghana Parliament for Keta
- In office 7 January 2009 – 6 January 2013
- Preceded by: Dan Abodakpi
- Succeeded by: Richard Quashigah

Personal details
- Born: 19 August 1968 (age 57)
- Party: National Democratic Congress
- Occupation: Politician
- Profession: Lawyer
- Website: Profile on GhanaMPs.com

Richard Lassey Agbenyefia is a Ghanaian politician who was the member of parliament for the Keta constituency from 2005 to 2017.

== Early life and education ==
Richard was born on 19 August 1968. He hails from Keta, a town in the Volta Region of Ghana. He obtained his LLB from University of Ghana in 1997 and his BL from Ghana School of Law in 1999.

== Career ==
He is a lawyer. He was the managing partner of Belorm Legal Consult in Accra.

== Politics ==
He is a member of the National Democratic Congress. He was the member of parliament for Keta Constituency in the Volta region of Ghana.

== Personal life ==
He is married with three children. He is a member of the Catholic Church.
