= List of conflicts in Ghana =

Location of Ghana (red)

The following is a list of conflicts in Ghana.

== Modern times ==
=== Dagbon ===
- 1896 Battle of Adibo

=== Denkyira ===
- 1588–1654 Dutch–Portuguese War
  - October 25, 1625 Battle of Elmina
  - August 24, 1637 – August 29, 1637 Battle of Elmina
- c. 1675 – c. 1701 Independence of the Ashanti Empire
  - 1701 Battle of Feyiase

=== Ashanti Empire ===
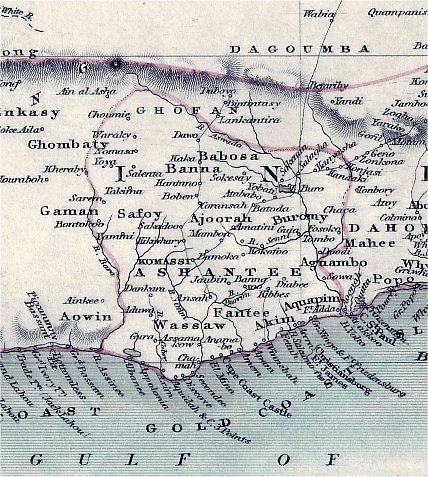
Map of the Ashanti Empire

- c. 1675 – c. 1701 Independence of the Ashanti Empire
  - 1701 Battle of Feyiase
- 1652–1784 Anglo–Dutch Wars
  - 1780–1784 Fourth Anglo–Dutch War
    - 1781–1782 Shirley's Gold Coast expedition
      - February 20, 1782 Battle of Elmina
- 1824–1901 Anglo–Ashanti wars
  - 1806–1816 Earlier wars
    - 1806–1807 Ashanti–Fante War
    - 1811 Ga–Fante War
    - 1814–1816 Ashanti–Akim–Akwapim War
  - 1823–1831 First Anglo-Ashanti War
    - 1823 Battle of Nsamankow
  - 1863 – 1864 Second Anglo-Ashanti War
  - 1873 – 1874 Third Anglo-Ashanti War
    - January 31, 1874 Battle of Amoaful
    - February 4, 1874 Battle of Ordashu
  - December 1895 – February 1896 Fourth Anglo-Ashanti War
  - March 1900 – September 1900 War of the Golden Stool

=== Colony of the Gold Coast ===
The Gold Coast (red)

- 1784 Sagbadre War
- 1824–1901 Anglo–Ashanti wars
  - 1806–1816 Earlier wars
    - 1806–1807 Ashanti–Fante War
    - 1811 Ga–Fante War
    - 1814–1816 Ashanti–Akim–Akwapim War
  - 1823–1831 First Anglo-Ashanti War
    - 1823 Battle of Nsamankow
  - 1837-1839 Dutch–Ahanta War
  - 1863–1864 Second Anglo-Ashanti War
  - 1869-1870 Dutch Gold Coast expedition of 1869–70
  - 1873–1874 Third Anglo-Ashanti War
    - January 31, 1874 Battle of Amoaful
    - February 4, 1874 Battle of Ordashu
  - December 1895 – February 1896 Fourth Anglo-Ashanti War
  - March 1900 – September 1900 War of the Golden Stool
- July 28, 1914 – November 11, 1918 World War I
  - August 3, 1914 – November 23, 1918 African theatre of World War I
    - August 9, 1914 – August 26, 1914 Togoland Campaign
      - August 13, 1914 Battle of Bafilo
      - August 15, 1914 Battle of Agbeluvhoe
      - August 22, 1914 Battle of Chra
- February 28, 1948 Accra Riots

=== Republic of Ghana ===
- 1994 – Konkomba–Nanumba conflict
- September 1, 2020 – Present Western Togoland Rebellion

== See also ==
- List of wars involving Ghana
- Ghana Armed Forces
- Ghana Army
- Ghana Air Force
- Ghana Navy
- Military history of Africa
- African military systems to 1800
- African military systems (1800–1900)
- African military systems after 1900
