= List of wars involving Ghana =

This article is a list of military conflicts involving Ghana, and its predecessor states and includes conflicts such as coups.

== Wars ==
- Battle of Guinea – 1478 – War of the Castilian Succession
- Battle of Elmina (1625) – 1625 – Dutch–Portuguese War
- Battle of Elmina (1637) – 1637 – Dutch–Portuguese War

Conflict	Combatant 1	Combatant 2	Result
Congo Crisis (1960-1964)	(United Nations) ONUC: Ghana; Others	Katanga (Democratic Republic of the Congo) ANC: Port Francqui incident	Victory: Debellation of the State of Katanga
Lebanese Civil War and South Lebanon conflict (1978–present)	(United Nations) UNIFIL: Ghana; Others	South Lebanon Army; Israel Hezbollah; Amal; PFLP-GC	Ongoing
First Liberian Civil War (1990-1997) Master Sergeant Thomas A. Nelson (right) of the 3rd US Army Special Forces Group inspects Ghanaian troops of ECOMOG at Roberts International Airport located outside of Monrovia, Liberia	ECOMOG: Ghana; Others	(Liberia) NPFL	Defeat: NPFL victory
Rwandan Civil War (1993-1994)	(United Nations) UNAMIR: Ghana; Others	Rwanda	Defeat: Rwanda Genocide; Great Lakes refugee crisis
Sierra Leone Civil War (1997-2002)	ECOMOG & (United Nations) UNAMSIL (Note: Ghana "changed hats" from ECOMOG to UN after UNAMSIL entered the conflict.): Ghana; Others; Sierra Leone: Kamajors; CDF; United Kingdom; Guinea	RUF (Sierra Leone) AFRC; West Side Boys; Liberia: NPFL	Victory
First Ivorian Civil War (2003-2007)	ECOMOG: Ghana; Others; France	Ivory Coast; COJEP FNCI; Liberia	Tentative peace agreement: Second Ivorian Civil War
Second Ivorian Civil War (2010-2011)	(United Nations) UNOCI: Ghana; Others; (Ivory Coast) FNCI (Ivory Coast) RDR; France; Ukraine	Military of Ivory Coast; COJEP; FPI	Victory: Gbagbo captured
Mali War (2013-2017)	(United Nations) MINUSMA: Ghana; Others; Government of Mali; France	MNLA Al-Qaeda Boko Haram Islamic State	Withdrawal: Ghana withdraws troops in 2017 due to security concerns
ECOWAS military intervention in the Gambia (2017)	ECOMOG: Ghana; Others	Pro-Jammeh forces	Ongoing
Western Togoland Rebellion (2020)	Ghana	Western Togoland Restoration Front	Ongoing

== Violent coups and coup attempts ==
Conflict	Combatant 1	Combatant 2	Result
Operation Cold Chop (1966)	Ghana (Nkrumah government)	(Ghana) National Liberation Council; Alleged Support: United States; United Kingdom	NLC Victory: Kwame Nkrumah deposed
Operation Guitar Boy (1967)	Ghana (NLC)	(Ghana) Coup plotters	NLC Victory: Coup failure
June 4th coup d'état (1979)	Ghana (Supreme Military Council)	(Ghana) Armed Forces Revolutionary Council	AFRC Victory: Colonel I.K. Acheampong deposed and executed
Nobistor affair (1985)	Ghana (Provisional National Defence Council)	(Ghana) Supporters of Godfrey Osei; United States mercenaries	PNDC Victory: Coup plot failed; Mercenaries detained in Brazil

== See also ==
- List of conflicts in Ghana
- Ghanaian Armed Forces
