= Ghana–Togo relations =

Bilateral relations between the two West African countries

Ghana-Togo relations
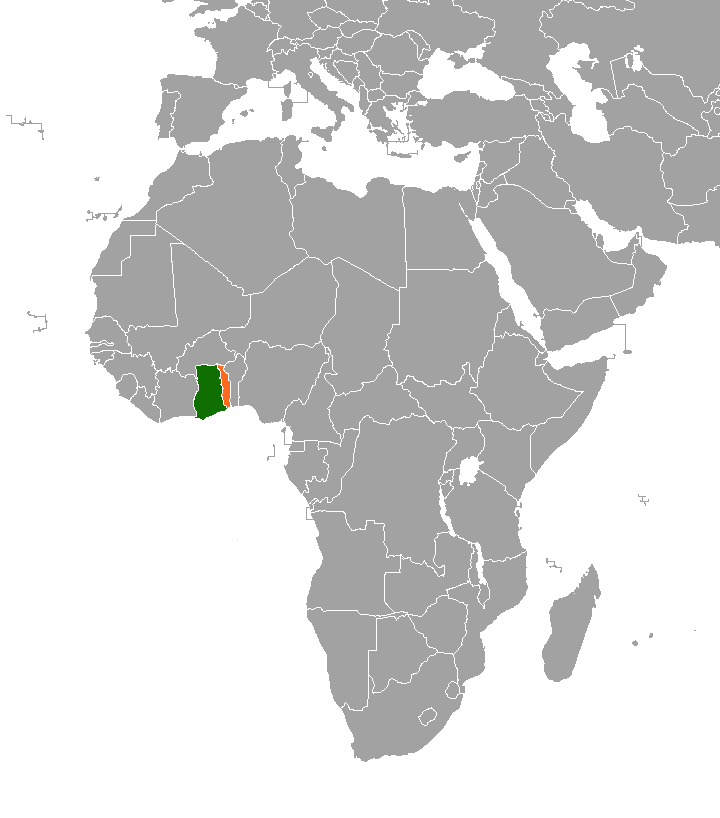
- Ghana: Togo

Ghana–Togo relations refers to the bilateral diplomatic relations between Ghana and Togo. The two countries share a border in West Africa, with their common border extending for approximately 1,098 km. The two countries have historically maintained active people-to-people and cultural exchanges, and several ethnic groups, particularly the Ewe people, reside on both sides of the border.

== History ==
Remains of the Kintampo Complex (2500 –1400 BCE) have been discovered in Togo. According to oral tradition, the ancestors of the Ghanaian Ewe people migrated to Ghana through Togo in the 17th century. In the mid-18th century, the Ashanti Empire extended into Togo.

=== Early years ===
After 1930 following the defeat of Germany, the League of Nations divided the German colony of Togoland from north to south, a decision that divided the Ewe people among the Gold Coast, British Togoland, and French Togoland. After 1945, the United Nations took over the Togoland mandates. During the 1950s, when the independence of Ghana from Britain was in sight, demands grew for a separate Ewe state, an idea that Kwame Nkrumah, leader of the Gold Coast independence movement, opposed. Following a UN plebiscite in May 1956, in which a majority of the inhabitants voted for union with Ghana, British Togoland refused. After Togolese independence from France in 1960, relations between Togo and Ghana deteriorated, aggravated by political differences and incidents such as smuggling across their common border. At times, relations have verged on open aggression.

The transfer of Togoland to Ghana resulted in many Togolese living in Ghana but working in the Togolese capital, Lomé.

=== 1970s ===
During the mid-1970s, Togolese President General Gnassingbé Eyadéma for a time revived the claim to a part or all of former British Togoland. Two leading Ewe members from the Volta Region sent a petition to the UN in 1974. By 1976, the Togoland Liberation Movement and the National Liberation Movement of Western Togoland existed and were agitating for separation from Ghana. The National Liberation Movement threatened the use of force against Ghana unless the UN intervened in the crisis but it failed to launch a successful guerrilla war against Ghana. The Eyadéma government publicly backed their demands, although it subsequently agreed to cooperate with the Ghanaian government against the separatist movements and against smuggling. A factor influencing Eyadéma's cooperative attitude was doubtless Togo's dependence upon electricity from Ghana's Akosombo Dam.

A consistent preoccupation of Ghana and Togo is that of national security. The PNDC regime repeatedly accused both Togo and Ivory Coast of harboring armed Ghanaian dissidents who planned to overthrow or to destabilize the PNDC. The PNDC also accused both countries of encouraging the smuggling of Ghanaian products and currencies across their borders, thus undermining Ghana's political and economic stability at a time when Ghana was experiencing a deep economic crisis.

=== 1980 onwards ===
In June 1983, when the PNDC was barely eighteen months old, groups opposed to the PNDC made a major attempt to overthrow it. Most of the rebels reportedly came from Togo. In August 1985, Togo in turn accused Ghana of complicity in a series of bomb explosions in Lomé, the Togolese capital. In July 1988, an estimated 124 Ghanaians were expelled from Togo. Nevertheless, relations subsequently improved significantly, leading in 1991 to the reactivation of several bilateral agreements.

Greatly improved relations between Ghana and Togo, especially after October 1990 when opposition pressure forced Eyadéma to agree to a transition to multiparty democracy, however, could hardly disguise the persistence of old mutual fears of threats to internal security. For instance, less than three weeks after Ghana's Fourth Republic was inaugurated, an immense refugee problem was created in Ghana. Following random attacks and killings of civilians in Lomé by Eyadéma's army on January 26, 1993, hundreds of thousands of terrorized Togolese began fleeing into Ghana. At the end of January, Ghanaian troops were placed on high alert on the Ghana-Togo border, although Obed Asamoah, the Ghanaian minister of foreign affairs, assured all concerned that there was no conflict between Ghana and Togo.

Sporadic shooting incidents in the spring continued to produce a regular flow of refugees into Ghana. By May, following Togo's partial closure of the border, all persons living in Togo, including diplomats, had to obtain a special permit from the Togolese interior ministry to travel to Ghana by road. Travelers from Ghana were allowed into Togo but were not permitted to return. By early June, half of Lomé's 600,000 residents were estimated to have fled to neighboring Ghana and Benin.

At the beginning of 1994, relations between Ghana and Togo became even worse. On January 6, a commando attack occurred in Lomé, which Togolese authorities described as an attempt to overthrow Eyadéma. The Togolese government accused Ghana of direct or indirect involvement and arrested Ghana's chargé d'affaires in Lomé. Togolese troops then bombarded a border post, killing twelve Ghanaians. Camps for Togolese refugees in Ghana also were reportedly bombarded. The Ghanaian government announced that it would press Togo to compensate the families of those killed. By mid-year, however, relations had improved markedly. In August Togo supported the nomination of Rawlings for the post of Economic Community of West African States (ECOWAS) chairman. Thereafter, a joint commission was set up to examine border problems, in mid-November a Ghanaian ambassador took up residence in Togo for the first time since the early 1980s, and Togo was considering the reopening of its border with Ghana.

=== 2000 onwards ===
Ghana and Togo's relations are getting better than before with the two countries pursuing projects that will enhance their mutual economic interests.

== See also ==
- Foreign relations of Ghana
- Foreign relations of Togo
- Ghana–Togo border
