= Raphael Armattoe =

Ghanaian physician and political activist (1913–1953)

Raphael E. G. Armattoe
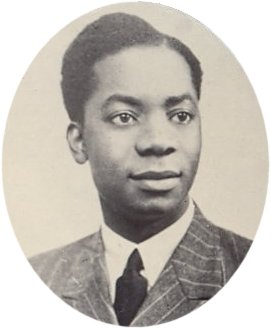
- Born: 12 August 1913; Keta, Gold Coast
- Died: 22 December 1953 (aged 40); Hamburg, West Germany
- Known for: Abochi drug against parasites, 'Cure' for Swollen-Shoot

Raphael Ernest Grail Armattoe (12 August 1913 – 22 December 1953) was a Ghanaian scientist and political activist. He was nominated for the 1948 Nobel Peace Prize and was a campaigner for unification of British and French Togoland. He was called by the New York Post "the 'Irishman' from West Africa", and the BBC producer Henry Swanzy referred to him as the "African Paracelsus".

== Biography ==
=== Early life and education ===
Armattoe was born at Keta in the Gold Coast (in what is now the Volta Region of Ghana). He received his early education in Lomé, Togoland before completing his primary education in Denu, Gold Coast. Between 1925 and 1928 he attended secondary school at Mfantsipim School, Cape Coast.

As Togoland changed from German to British and French hands, Armattoe ended up being fluent in German, French and English; whilst also being fluent in Spanish and Portuguese. He also spoke his native Ewe language. He left for Germany in 1930 for further studies, with most of his tertiary education was in Germany and France.

He apparently left Germany for France due to rising Nazism. He continued his studies in anthropology, literature and medicine at the Sorbonne.

=== Research, science and medicine ===
Armattoe moved to Edinburgh, where he qualified to practice medicine.

He then got a locum job in Belfast, Northern Ireland, and following that worked at the Civil Defence first-aid post in Brooke Park, Derry, between 1939 and 1945. After the Second World War, he opened a medical practice at his home on Northland Road in Derry. He later established and became the director of the Lomeshie Research Centre, named after his mother.

In 1947, he attended the Nobel Prize laureation ceremonies with his friend Erwin Schrödinger, who won the Nobel Prize in Physics in 1933, being the only African amongst the thousand intellectuals invited to attend the event in Stockholm. Schrödinger later wrote the foreword for Armattoe's book The Golden Age of West African Civilization. Armattoe later successfully applied for an anthropological research grant worth £3,000 at the time from the Wenner-Gren Foundation for Anthropological Research. The Abochi drug which can cure guinea-worms, toothaches, bronchitis, boils and allied diseases patent was later bought by a prominent Nigerian drug company at the time. In 1948, at the age of just 35, he was nominated for the Nobel Peace Prize by members of the parliament of Ireland. The nomination was also supported by three MPs from Northern Ireland.

At this stage, he started being more involved with writing and giving talks, especially relating to anthropology. He was described by some who knew him as a marvellous doctor and a good speaker. Through association with international scientific societies he is regarded as one of the very few scientists at the time to understand atomic energy.

Later in 1948 he returned to West Africa, where he conducted research mainly on Ewe physical anthropology but also set up a medical clinic at Kumasi in the Ashanti Region. He also turned his attention to poetry, writing and politics. His first collection of poems was Between the Forest and the Sea (1950). His next collection, Deep Down in the Black Man's Mind, was published in 1954, after his death.

=== Politics ===
Armattoe and Kwame Nkrumah first met at the 1945 Pan-African Congress in Manchester; a conference attended by many future Ghanaians politicians as well as Hastings Banda, Jomo Kenyatta and W. E. B. Du Bois. Though they both favoured independence for the colonies, Nkrumah was centrist while Armattoe was federalist. He joined the Ghana Congress Party rather than Nkrumah's Convention People's Party.

Armattoe maintained contact with Du Bois who partook in his study Testament to Youth.

He belonged to the Ewe ethnic group, who he sought the unification of its people who were divided by colonial powers between British Togoland, the Gold Coast and French Togoland; he wanted its people united as one Ewe nation-state being active within the Togoland Congress, advocating for Ewe Unification.

In 1953, Armattoe addressed the United Nations in New York City regarding Togoland and the "Eweland Question", which Die Welt at the time regarded as one of the most important documents in African history in the 20th century.

== Family ==
His father Glikpo Armattoe was a merchant of Palime, Togoland, who traded mainly with the Germans and also studied local indigenous languages. Armattoe was married to Swiss-born Leony Elizabeth Schwartz, who was also known as "Marina". They had two daughters, the elder, Irusia, being born in Derry. Armattoe and his family lived at Kumasi in Ghana until his death.

== Death and legacy ==
Armattoe fell ill and died in a hospital in Hamburg. His wife reported that he said he had been poisoned by some unknown persons. He had apparently been attacked previously by supporters of Kwame Nkrumah, for withholding the cure to swollen shoot unless the government approached him in a respectful manner, having chosen to distance himself from Nkrumah's Government.

Inscribed on his gravestone in Hamburg are the words "Africa's Greatest Nationalist".

A blue plaque in his honour was unveiled by the Ulster History Circle at 7 Northland Road, Derry, where Armattoe lived from 1939 to 1945 and carried on his practice as a GP.

== Publications ==
- Articles, mainly on medical subjects, reprinted from periodicals. ASIN B000WETQ54.
- Japan's Place in the Sun. 1932
- Uber Die Heutige Einstellung Der Wissenschaft. 1933
- Moeurs et Coiturnes Togolaises. 1939
- The Pattern Youth: An interim report. 1943. ASIN B0007KF9CW.
- A Dental Survey of the British Isles. 1943. p. 5. ASIN B0007KF9D6.
- A Racial Survey of the British People ... Lecture. Londonderry Sentinel. 1944. ASIN B000WEXNRQ.
- The Swiss Contribution to Western Civilization. Dundalk: Dundalgan Press. 1944. ASIN B00408QC0A.
- Armattoe, Raphael; Gaetano De Gennaro; Erwin Schroedinger; Albert Schweitzer (1945). Homage to Three Great Men: Schweitzer, Schroedinger, De Gennaro. Londonderry Sentinel. ASIN B000WEQ18O.
- The Golden Age of West African Civilization. The Londonderry Sentinel for the Lomeshie Research Centre. 1946. ASIN B0006EUHIA.
- Anthropology in Portugal. 1946
- Armattoe, Raphael (1946). Space, Time, and Race; Or, The Age of Man in America. p. 16. ASIN B0007JLE22.
- Personal Recollections of the Nobel Laureation Festival of 1947: With an appendix listing all the distinguished guests at the Nobel banquet. Lomeshie Research Centre. 1948. p. 62. ASIN B0007J26WO.
- Between the Forest and the Sea: Collected Poems. Armattoe. 1950. p. 78. ASIN B0000CHOO0.
- Selected Correspondence with Men of Science. 1951
- Anaphylaxis (A medical treatise). 1952
- Testament to Youth. 1953
- The Ewes in Eweland. 1954 (An anthropological study)
- Dawn over Africa. 1954 (Novel)
- Deep Down in the Black Man's Mind: Poems. Ilfracombe: Alfred H. Stockwell. 1954. p. 112. ASIN B0000CIX8L.
- Wiegraebe, P.; Raphael Armattoe (1954). Early Ghanaian Poetry. Periodicals Service Company. ISBN 978-0-8115-3039-2.

== External links and sources ==
- Amazon book search
- "Dr. Raphael Ernest Grail Armattoe (1913–1953): Physician and writer", Dictionary of Ulster Biography.
