= Ashanti–Akim–Akwapim War =

African war from 1814 to 1816

Date	1814–1816
Location	Gold Coast
Result	Ashanti victory

Belligerents
Ashanti Empire	Akyem; Akuapem

Commanders and leaders
Osei Bonsu	Lack

The Ashanti–Akim–Akwapim War, also known as the Ashanti Invasion of the Gold Coast, was the expansion of West African Empire of Ashanti against the alliance of Akyem and Akuapem tribes from 1814 until 1816 for access to the coast. This battle was not a direct war on Akyem states, which were never subdued by any power, but a war to get access to the coasts in which the Akyem along with Akuapem forces allied for.

In 1814 the Ashanti, under the leadership of Asantehene Osei Bonsu, defeated the outnumbered Akim-Akwapim alliance.

After attacking the Fante during this period, the Ashanti seized Accra and took over Fante country, turning it into an Ashanti province.

After the war and with access to the coast the Ashanti followed up their victory by pillaging the coastal Ga people.

== See also ==
- Empire of Ashanti
- Ashanti-Fante War
- Ga-Fante War
- Anglo-Asante Wars
- History of Ghana
