= Ghana–Togo border =

International border

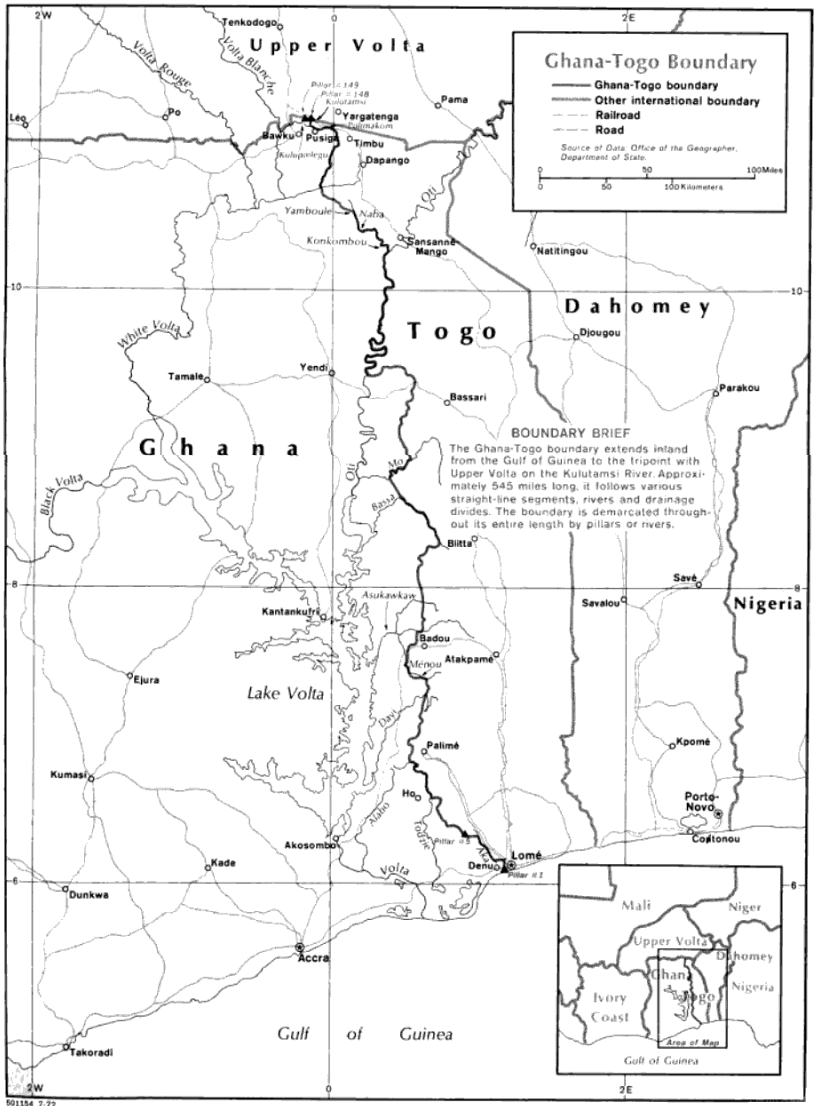
Map of the Ghana-Togo border

The Ghana–Togo border is 1,098 km (682 miles) in length and runs from the tripoint with Burkina Faso in the north to the Atlantic Ocean in the south.

== Description ==
The border starts in the north at the tripoint with Burkina Faso; it then veers eastwards, almost re-touching the Burkinabe border and thereby creating a piece of Togolese territory almost cut off by only 0.14 km (140 m) from the main body of the country. The border then turns southwards, proceeding overland before reaching the White Volta river. The border follows this river for a while, before veering south-eastwards, utilising overland lines and some small rivers, eventually reaching the Oti River. The border then follows the Oti southwards, then veers eastwards along one of its branches, before turning south overland down to the Mo River. After a brief section on the Mo the border then continues to the south, using various overland segments and some small rivers, before eventually terminating at the Atlantic coast just west of Togo's capital Lomé.

The highest points of both countries, Mount Afadja in Ghana and Mount Agou (French: Mont Agou) in Togo, lie close to each other near the border.

== History ==
Map of the former German Togoland - the purple area was given to Britain in 1919 and later merged with Ghana

Remains of the Kintampo Complex (2500 –1400 BCE) have been discovered in Togo. Europeans made contact with the coast of Ghana (then referred to as the Gold Coast) from the 15th century, and it became the centre of a various trading networks, notably in gold and slaves; Germany, Sweden, Denmark, Portugal and the Netherlands all had trading posts in the region. In the 18th and 19th centuries Togo served as the buffer zone between the Ashanti Empire and Dahomey until the establishment of German Togoland in the 1880s.

Britain also took an interest in the region, and during the 19th century became the predominant regional power, taking over all the rival trading posts and declaring the Gold Coast colony in 1867. The British gradually extended their rule into the interior, against often determined resistance by the Ashanti Empire; the northern region of what is now Ghana was annexed to the Gold Coast colony in 1901. The 1880s saw an intense competition for territory in Africa by the European powers, a process known as the 'Scramble for Africa'. Germany began taking an interest in acquiring colonies, signing treaties with chiefs along the coast of modern Togo in July 1884. The colony of German Togoland was then gradually extended inland.

An initial border in the southernmost section west of Lomé was agreed upon by Britain and Germany on 14 July 1886. It was extended further to the north to the Volta-Daka confluence the following year. This section of the border was then delimited in more detail via an Anglo-German agreement of 1 July 1890. The border was extended further northwards via mutual agreement on 14 November 1899. The full boundary was then delimited in late 1901, and then demarcated on the ground 1901–02; this final boundary was approved on 25 June 1904.

In the First World War German Togoland was conquered by the Allies and then split into British and French mandates along a mandate lines agreed upon on 10 July 1919. The new boundary between the mandates (i.e. the modern Ghana–Togo border) was then confirmed between Britain and France on 21 October 1929 following demarcation work conducted 1927–29.

By plebiscite, British Togoland was incorporated into the Gold Coast colony in 1956, which gained independence as Ghana the following year. France had also initiated a process of decolonisation at this time, culminating in the granting of broad internal autonomy to each African colony in 1958 within the framework of the French Community. French Togoland declared complete independence on 27 April 1960, whereupon the frontier with Ghana became one between two sovereign states. The two states undertook some re-demarcation work in the 1970s.

== Settlements near the border ==
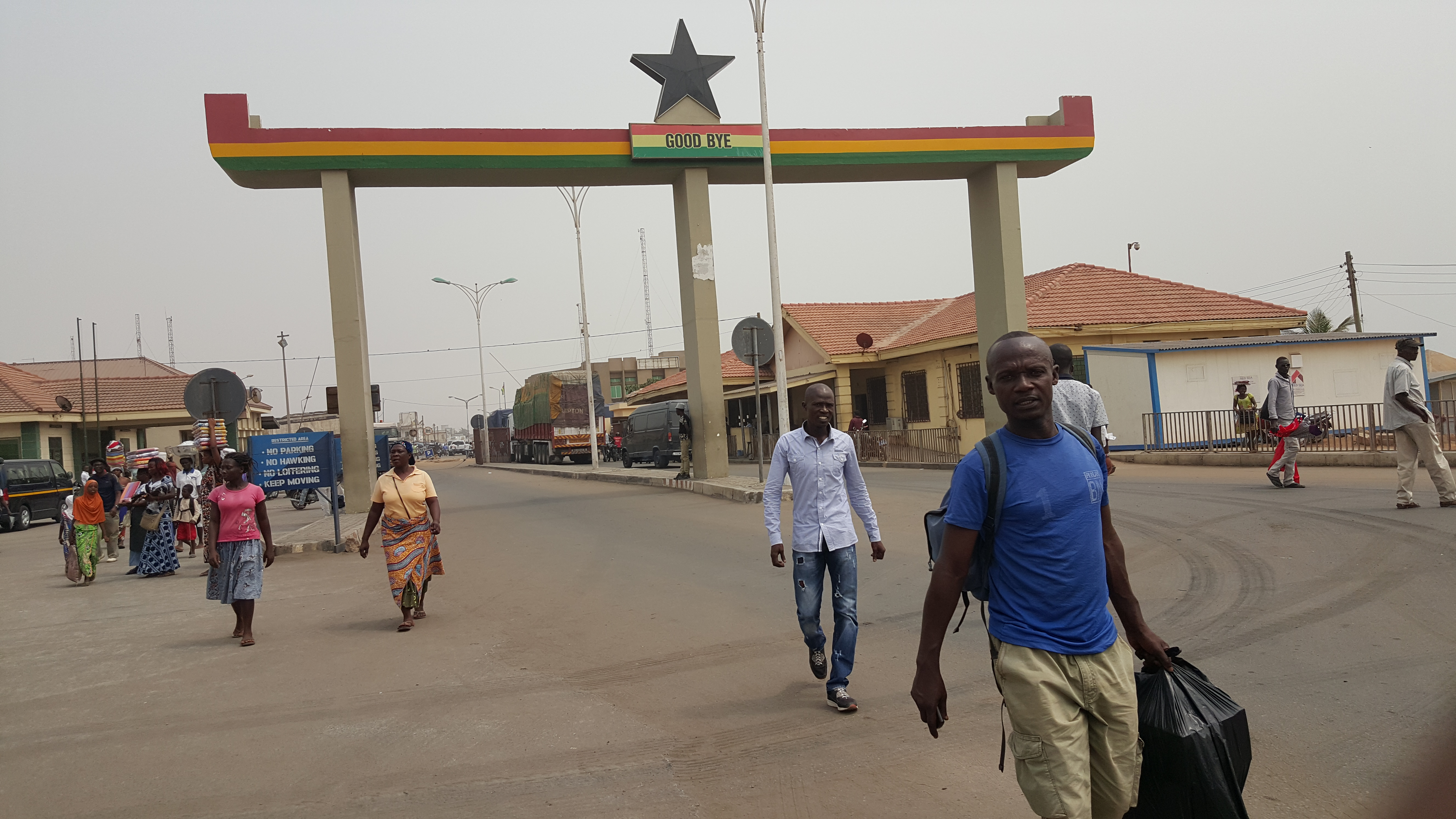
The border crossing at Aflao

=== Ghana ===
- Wurinyanga
- Nakpanduri
- Bunkpurugu
- Wawjawga
- Kilingg
- Nkanta
- Breniasi
- Agbome
- Denu
- Aflao

=== Togo ===
- Tami
- Bantierk
- Kpankpande
- Passao
- Biakopabe
- Bidjabe
- Dimouri
- Kakpa
- Bloma
- Kpalimé
- Kpadafe
- Agoueve
- Lomé

== Border crossings ==
The main border crossing is at Aflao-Lomé; other crossings include Ho-Kpalimé and Leklebi-Kame.

== See also ==
- Ghana–Togo relations
