= Western Togoland Rebellion =

Separatist conflict in eastern Ghana since 2020

- Western Togoland (purple) within Ghana
Date	1 September 2020 – 2024
Location	former British Togoland, Ghana
Status	Ongoing

Belligerents
Ghana; Ghana Armed Forces; Minister for Defence	Western Togoland; Western Togoland Restoration Front

Commanders and leaders
John Mahama; Jane Naana Opoku-Agyemang; Mubarak Mohammed Muntaka; Cassiel Ato Forson; William Agyapong; Lawrence Kwaku Gbetanu; Eric Agyen-Frempong; Godwin Livinus Bessing; Former commanders: (Ghana) Nana Akufo-Addo; (Ghana) Mahamudu Bawumia; (Ghana) Ambrose Dery; (Ghana) Henry Quartey; (Ghana) Dominic Nitiwul; (Ghana) Edward Omane Boamah; Obed Akwa; Seth Amoama; Thomas Oppong-Peprah; Thomas Oppong-Peprah; Bismarck Kwasi Onwona; Frank Hanson; Frederick Asare Bekoe; Seth Amoama; Issah Adam Yakubu	Togbe Yesu Kwabla Edudzi; Akplaga Sogbolisa; Akplaga Seyram Matts

Strength
Unknown	c. 500–6,700 (WTRF claim)

Casualties and losses
1 killed, 1 injured, 3+ captured	1+ killed 113+ captured
- At least 6 civilians killed

The Western Togoland Rebellion is a separatist revolt led by the Ewe nationalist organization Western Togoland Restoration Front (WTRF) against the government of Ghana. The group seeks the independence of former British Togoland under the leadership of the Ewe.

The Ewe make up most of the support for the independence movement and mainly inhabit the southern part of Western Togoland, especially around the cities of Ho, Kpandu, and Hohoe. Consequently, in the centre and northern areas of Western Togoland, where groups like the Dagbani, Akan and Guan dominate, support for independence is much more limited.

The independence movement can be traced back to the colonial era, with Ewe-dominated organizations such as the Togoland Congress campaigning for the unification of the Ewe people in British Togoland and French Togoland. More recently, groups such as the Homeland Study Group Foundation, a member of Unrepresented Nations and Peoples Organization, have advocated for Ewe-led Western Togoland independence. The WTRF is the first of these organizations to revolt against the Ghanaian government.

== Background ==
=== Pre-integration with Ghana ===
During World War I, the Allies conquered German Schutzgebiet Togoland and divided the country into British Togoland (Western Togoland) and French Togoland (Eastern Togoland). The British Togoland territory had been a League of Nations mandate, then a United Nations Trust Territory under British control.

In 1954, the British government informed the UN that it would be unable to administer the Trust Territory after 1957. In response, in December 1955, the UN General Assembly passed a resolution advising the British government to hold a plebiscite on the future of British Togoland.

Results of the plebiscite by local council

On 9 May 1956, this plebiscite was held under UN supervision and gave two alternatives to the people: union with soon-to-be Ghana or continuation as a Trust Territory until neighbouring French Togoland had decided upon its future. The Ewe-based Togoland Congress campaigned against integration with Ghana and preferred amalgamation with French Togoland, with the aim of forming a single, Ewe-majority country. The eventual result was reported to be 58% in favour of integration, although in the southern part of the territory, where the Togoland Congress had campaigned vigorously, 55% of voters had voted for separation from Gold Coast and continued UN Trusteeship.

Despite concerns over the lawfulness of the referendum and questions about Britain's concerns for the peoples of southern Western Togoland and their will for independence, unification with Ghana as an administrative region became a reality and in 1956 British Togoland was incorporated into Ghana.

=== Post-integration with Ghana ===
There have been several independence organisations in Western Togoland since the plebiscite including the Togoland Congress and National Liberation Movement of Western Togoland (also known as Tolimo), the latter of the two was declared illegal in the 1970s.

In 1973, 120 chiefs of the Volta Regional House of Chiefs who demonstrated their opposition to the extension of the Eastern Region of Ghana into the Volta Region faced a violent crackdown by the military forces.

In 2017, 7 members of the Homeland Study Group Foundation HSGF were arrested for wearing T-shirts with the inscription "9 May 2017 is OUR DAY Western Togoland", referring to the date when the organisation attempted to declare independence.

On 5 May 2019, 9 leaders of the HSGF who were calling for the independence of parts of Volta Region were picked up for planning to declare parts of the Volta Region an independent state.

On 8 May 2019, the Volta Regional Police Command in collaboration with the 66 Artillery Regiment arrested an additional 81 members of the HSGF for their involvement in planning a protest against the arrest of their leaders. 54 of the suspects were arrested aboard a bus whilst entering Ho from Aflao direction. 17 were arrested in the house of the leader of the group, Charles Kormi Kudzordi near the 66 artillery regiment barracks and 10 were arrested at other entry points into the Ho municipality. They were all later released on bail or let off with a caution.

On 8 July 2019, Charles Kormi Kudzordzi was airlifted to the capital Accra to stand trial for treason, only for the state to drop the charges along with 8 other leaders.

On 14 December 2019, WTRF claimed to have about 2,000 Western Togoland military men and women pass from Gorrilla military school.

The Western Togoland Restoration Front declared the sovereignty of Western Togoland on 1 September 2020. After the declaration, various signs were erected throughout former British Togoland welcoming people into "Western Togoland".After this, however, a joint military and police operation was deployed to the Volta region to restore order in the Volta region.

== Timeline ==
=== 2020 ===
==== September ====
On 1 September – WTRF declared the sovereignty of Western Togoland.

On 25 September – The WTRF seized control of an armoury and then proceeded to blockade various roads leading into Ghana's Volta Region. Aveyime and Mepe police stations were also attacked, freeing inmates as well as seizing weapons of the police, shooting and injuring the Divisional Police Commander, the seizure of police pick-up vehicles amid firing of gunshots. The rebels made off with at least 15 AK-47 and 4 pump action guns at Aveyime police station. Two more weapons were taken at Mepe police station. They also disarmed the reinforcement team, taking their weapons including the police commander's pistol.

In response to the attacks on the police stations a joint military-police team, in conjunction with other security agencies deployed to the affected areas and succeeded in apprehending 31 members of the WTRF. Fire exchanges between the WTRF and the security agencies led to the death of one member of the WTRF and injury to three others.

According to residents of the town of Juapong, soldiers allegedly stormed a community where one of the roadblocks were mounted. They raided homes and arrested anyone they suspect of belonging to the separatist group and might have taken part in the roadblock. Those arrested were beaten up and paraded around the roadside. Residents say at least two people who were shot by the soldiers died including a coconut seller identified just as Emmanuel. Another 3 were found dead in Battor.

On 27 September – After an emergency meeting by its members in Ho, the Volta Regional House of Chiefs condemned the WTRF violence on 25 September. In a statement which was signed by the Vice President of the House, Togbe Tepre Hodo IV, called for the resolution of certain worrying and pertinent issues in connection with the alleged rebel actions, which it said were important for strengthening peace. For instance, the statement sought to know how the group managed to mount billboards and flags without anyone noticing until the billboards were seen in the morning, in all past cases. The statement sought to know the identities of those arrested following the events of Friday, September 25, amid allegations that innocent bystanders who were observing what was happening were arrested. They also wanted to know the identities of the 2 people killed at Juapong and three killed at Battor. The statement also expressed concern over the inability of National Security to pick up any intelligence on the activities of the WTRF to prevent them or arrest the conspirators.

On 29 September – Separatists attacked a bus yard belonging to the State Transport Corporation in the city of Ho. Police later arrested some 30 protesters and one civilian was killed in an exchange of fire between the separatists and government forces. The General Secretary of the National Democratic Congress (NDC) accused the ruling New Patriotic Party (NPP) of being behind recent attacks of the WTRF in the Volta Region. In return, Nana Obiri Boahen, the Deputy General Secretary of the NPP said that majority of the members of the WTRF belong to the NDC.

On 29–30 September – Police arrested 5 WTRF separatists who attacked the police stations on 5 September with 20+ other separatists.

On 30 September – The HSGF denied allegations that it attacked the State Transport Company yard in Ho.

==== October ====
On 2 October – Security forces in Ghana arrested 60 separatists who are allegedly members of the WTRF. Due to the attacks by the WTRF the Ghanaian government granted autonomy to the town of Alavanyo.

On 4 October – Police arrested 17 suspected WTRF separatists. 14 AK-47 rifles, 3 pump-action guns, 1 pistol, a shotgun, and some other weapons were also retrieved.

On 6 October – The leader of the HSGF, Charles Kwame Kudzordzithe, strongly condemned the violence on all sides and recalls Ghanaian authorities for peace talks.

On 9 October – People loyal to the WTRF attempted to blockade various roadways throughout the Volta Region and Greater Accra Region.

On 10 October – Security officers cleared heaps of sand on the road that were placed by the WTRF to block drivers.

On 13 October – A video on social media claims Western Togoland secessionists are training 4,300 military men. According to the leader of their military wing, their military wing is called the Dragons, and they have been training in a nearby country, most likely Togo. They also claim they are not rebels or militants, but well trained military men. They also sent a note of caution to Energy Minister John Peter Amewu, Volta Regional Minister Archibald Yao Letsa and the MP for North Tongu, Samuel Okudzeto Ablakwa, saying "We're giving you, John Peter Amewu, Archibald Letsa Yao, Okudzeto Ablakwa, prior notice. The Dragons, together with Gorillas, will enter the land after 21 days to claim the state. The Gorillas, together with Dragons, are merging to deliver their motherland, Western Togoland." The group further appealed to the chiefs and leaders of the various communities in the Volta Region, not to be deceived by anyone who offers them money to work against their mission.

According to the Institute for Security Studies analyst, Andrews Atta-Asamoah, it is doubtful the secessionists have over 4,000 men and it is more likely the video was meant to serve a propaganda purpose.

==== November ====
On 30 November – soldiers from the Ghanaian Armed Forces were deployed to the Volta Region ahead of the 2020 presidential election on December 7.

==== December ====
On 17 December – a fake lawyer representing the Western Togoland separatists was arrested.

On 22 December – 30 alleged separatists were re-arrested after the Accra Circuit Court had discharged them.

=== 2021 ===
==== February ====
On 4 February – Unidentified armed men clashed with a police patrol in Kwaebibirem District, Eastern Region. One policemen was killed and another wounded. The police patrol was dispatched there to respond to a robbery attack and road blocking.

==== April ====
On 13 April – 3 officers were arrested for separatist views about Western Togoland.

=== 2022 ===
==== January ====
On 10 January – 6 separatists were arrested for planning to attack a Bank of Ghana office in Hohoe.

==== April ====
On 6 April – Ghanaian authorities had increased security alert levels due to concerns of attacks by separatists.

=== 2023 ===
A few isolated incidents of violence occurred.

=== 2024 ===
In 2024, four executive members of the Western Togoland Restoration Front (WTRF) were sentenced to a total jail term of 17 years by an Accra High Court.

Western Togoland groups urged a boycott of the 2024 Ghanaian general election.

== National reactions ==
- The Volta Region House of Chiefs condemned the succession attempt, stating that they do not support "criminals"
- Yaa-Naa Gariba II banned the movement from Dagbon

== International reactions ==
- Unrepresented Nations and Peoples Organization – The UNPO called for dialogue and non-violence in Western Togoland.
- United States – The US embassy for Ghana advised citizens to avoid travel to the Volta Region until the security situation is resolved.

== See also ==
- Anglophone Crisis – An ongoing separatist revolt in former British Southern Cameroons, which was dissolved in a manner similar to British Togoland.
