= Kpankpande =

- Location in Togo
- Coordinates: 9°53′N 0°24′E
- Country: Togo
- Region: Kara Region
- Prefecture: Bassar Prefecture
- Time zone: UTC + 0

Kpankpande is a village in north-western Togo, in the Bassar Prefecture of the Kara Region adjacent to the border with Ghana.
