= Western Togoland =

Region of Ghana and self-proclaimed state

Western Togoland Togoland de l'Ouest (French)
- Flag Coat of arms
- Official languages: English
- Common languages: English; French
- Religion: Christianity; Islam; Afa; Voodoo; Yeweh
- Establishment: 25 September 2020
- History
  - UNPO membership: 2017
  - Established: 25 September 2020

Population
  - 2020 estimate: 4,000,000

Territory claimed by Western Togoland

Western Togoland (French: Togoland de l'Ouest) is a self-proclaimed state led by the Western Togoland Restoration Front. It is considered by the international community to be part of Ghana, and is currently engaged in a revolt against Ghana.

The region claimed by separatists is situated between the Lake Volta and the Ghana–Togo border. Western Togoland has been a member state of the Unrepresented Nations and Peoples Organization (UNPO) since 2017, and in 2020, separatists in Western Togoland declared independence from the Republic of Ghana.

== History ==
The German Empire established the Togoland protectorate in 1884. Under German administration, the protectorate was regarded as a model colony or Musterkolonie. During the First World War in 1914, Britain and France invaded the protectorate. After the German defeat and the signing of the Treaty of Versailles, the western part of Togoland became a British mandate, British Togoland, and the eastern part became French Togoland. After the Second World War British Togoland became a United Nations Trust Territory that was under British administration. In the 1956 British Togoland status plebiscite, 58% of the western Togolese voted to integrate into what would in 1957 become independent Ghana.

On May 9, 2017, the Homeland Study Group Foundation (French: Fondation du Groupe d'étude de la Patrie) unsuccessfully tried to declare the independence of Western Togoland. On May 7, 2019, the national executive of the Volta separatist group, Homeland Study Group Foundation (HSGF/FGEP), Emmanuel Agbavor has rejected claims that the group had a militia.

=== Independence ===
On September 25, 2020, secessionists demanded that Ghanaian Security forces leave the Volta Region after attacking several police stations in the North Tongu District of the Volta Region. In a press statement declaring their secession from Ghana, the Homeland Study Group Foundation under the leadership of Charles Kormi Kudzordz declared sovereignty over the area. The Government of Ghana did not take the declaration seriously, viewing it as a "joke", although prominent security expert Adib Sani urged the government to treat the issue as a national security risk. There have been few injuries and around 2 deaths in the clashes following the declaration of independence though the Republic of Ghana claims to have gained intel on those clashes before they occurred. Ghana sources claim the secessionist group heading the independence movement, the Homeland Study Group, is under control. However, the secessionists took over arms and set up road blockades. The president of the Republic of Ghana has denied negotiating with the secessionists.

== Demographics ==
About 4 million people live in Western Togoland. The languages spoken in Western Togoland include Twi, English, French, Ewe, Dangme, Avatime, and several others. The main religions are Christianity, Islam, and Voodoo. The Ewes make up the majority of those living in Western Togoland.

== See also ==
- Ghana-Togo border
- Western Togoland Rebellion
