= Western Togoland Restoration Front =

Ewe militant separatist organisation

- Front de restauration du Togoland de l'Ouest
- Flag of the WTRF
- Leaders: Togbe Yesu Kwabla Edudzi I Akplaga Sogbolisa; Akplaga Seyram Matts
- Dates active: c. 2019 – present
- Ideology: Ewe nationalism Separatism
- Size: c. 500–6,700
- Wars: Western Togoland Rebellion

Western Togoland Restoration Front (French: Front de restauration du Togoland de l'Ouest; abbreviated WTRF or FRTO) is a Ewe political, militant, nationalist and a separatist organization that advocates for an independent state of Western Togoland and possibly the Ewe ethnic parts of the Volta Region from Ghana.

== History ==
=== Early activity ===
While it is unknown who created the group or even when it started, the first signs of active by the WTRF was back in December 2019 when a Facebook account by the name of Akplaga Seyram Matts started making pro-Western Togoland post including claiming that 2,000 Western Togoland military men and women passed from a guerrilla military school on 14 December.

On 17 February 2020, the 66 Artillery Regiment of the Ghana Armed Forces (GAF) rounded up 21 people suspected of being separatists from a secret training camp at Kpevedui, near Feivu. Originally, there were 25 people in the camp, but 4 escaped. According to those rounded up, they were tricked into joining the separatist group that claimed it was the Ghana Armed Forces. Enus Agbenyo, one of the captives, claimed the 4 who escaped were the recruiters. At the time it was thought the Homeland Study Group Foundation (HSGF) was behind it but the HSGF has denied claims that it has a militia or is training anybody. The HSGF is the body representing Western Togoland in the Unrepresented Nations and Peoples Organization.

=== Western Togoland Rebellion ===
On 1 September the WTRF declared the sovereignty of Western Togoland.

On 25 September the WTRF seized control of an armoury and then proceeded to blockade various roads leading into Ghana's Volta Region. Aveyime and Mepe police stations were also attacked, freeing inmates as well as seizing weapons of the police, shooting and injuring the Divisional Police Commander, the seizure of Police pick-up vehicles amid the firing of gunshots. The rebels made off with at least 15 AK47 and four pump action guns at Aveyime Police station. Two more weapons were taken at Mepe Police Station. They also disarmed the reinforcement team, taking their weapons including the Police Commander's pistol. In response to the attacks on the police stations a joint Military-Police Team, in conjunction with other security agencies deployed to the affected areas and succeeded in apprehending 31 members of the WTRF. Later that day fire exchanged between the WTRF and security agencies led to the death of one member of the WTRF and the injury to three others.

On 29 September the WTRF attacked a bus yard belonging to the State Transport Corporation in the city of Ho and set ablaze a bus and slightly burnt another. Later one civilian was killed in an exchange of fire between the separatists and government forces.

After 29 September blockades were still set up and at least 82 people were arrested for being suspected WTRF members. The WTRF has also claimed to have 4,300 military men being trained in a nearby country. According to them, those troops will invade Western Togoland on 3 November and join up with the guerrilla troops.
