= Danish overseas colonies =

1537–1953 colonies of Denmark–Norway and Denmark

Danish overseas colonies Danish: Danske kolonier
- 1537–1953 (Denmark); 1537–1814 (Norway)
- Flag Coat of arms
- Motto: Ske Herrens vilje "The Lord's will be done"
- Anthem: Der er et yndigt land (English: "There is a lovely country") (1835–1953) Kong Christian stod ved højen mast (English: "King Christian stood by the lofty mast")
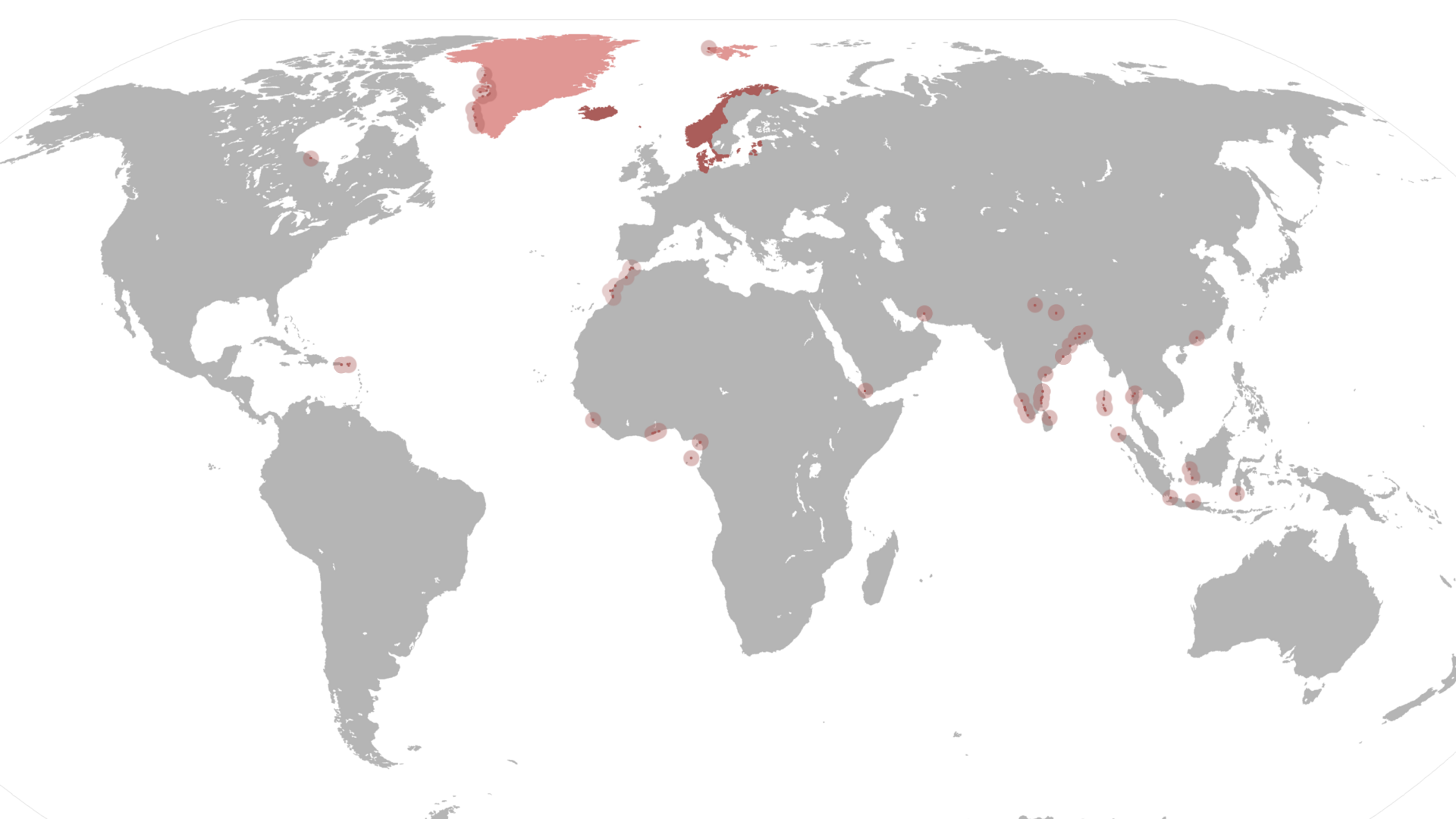
- All territories ever owned by Denmark–Norway (including trading posts)
- Status: Colonial empire
- Capital: Copenhagen
- Common languages: Official language: Danish; Regional languages: Norwegian, German, Icelandic, Greenlandic, Faroese
- Religion: Evangelical Lutheranism
- Government: Constitutional monarchy
- King
  - 1537–1559: Christian III (first)
  - 1947–1953: Frederik IX (last)
- Prime Minister
  - 1848–1852: Adam Wilhelm Moltke (first)
  - 1950–1953: Erik Eriksen (last)
- Legislature: Rigsdagen
  - Upper house: Landstinget
  - Lower house: Folketing
- History
  - Established: 1537
  - Greenland made integral part of Denmark: 1953
- Currency: Rigsdaler
Preceded by	Succeeded by
Old Kingdom of Norway	Kingdom of Denmark

Danish overseas colonies and Dano-Norwegian colonies (Danish: De danske kolonier) were the colonies that Denmark–Norway (Denmark after 1814) possessed from 1537 until 1953. At its apex, the colonies spanned four continents: Africa, Asia, Europe, and North America.

The period of colonial expansion marked a rise in the status and power of Danes and Norwegians in the Kalmar Union. Danes and Norwegians during this time increasingly saw themselves as citizens of the same "State Fatherland" (Statsfædrelandet), the realm of the Oldenburg monarchs.

In the 17th century, following territorial losses on the Scandinavian Peninsula, Denmark–Norway began to develop forts with trading posts in West Africa, and colonies in the Caribbean, and the Indian subcontinent. Christian IV first initiated the policy of expanding Denmark–Norway's overseas trade, as part of the mercantilist wave that was sweeping Europe. Denmark–Norway's first colony was established at Tranquebar (Trankebar) on India's southern coast in 1620. Admiral Ove Gjedde led the expedition that established the colony.

After 1814, when Norway was ceded to Sweden following the Napoleonic Wars, Denmark retained what remained of Norway's medieval colonial holdings.

Today, the only remaining vestiges are two originally Norwegian dependencies that are currently within the Danish Realm, the Faroe Islands and Greenland; the Faroes were a Danish county until 1948, while Greenland's colonial status ceased in 1953. They are now autonomous territories within the Kingdom of Denmark with home rule, in a relationship referred to as the "Unity of the Realm".

== Overview ==
=== Africa ===
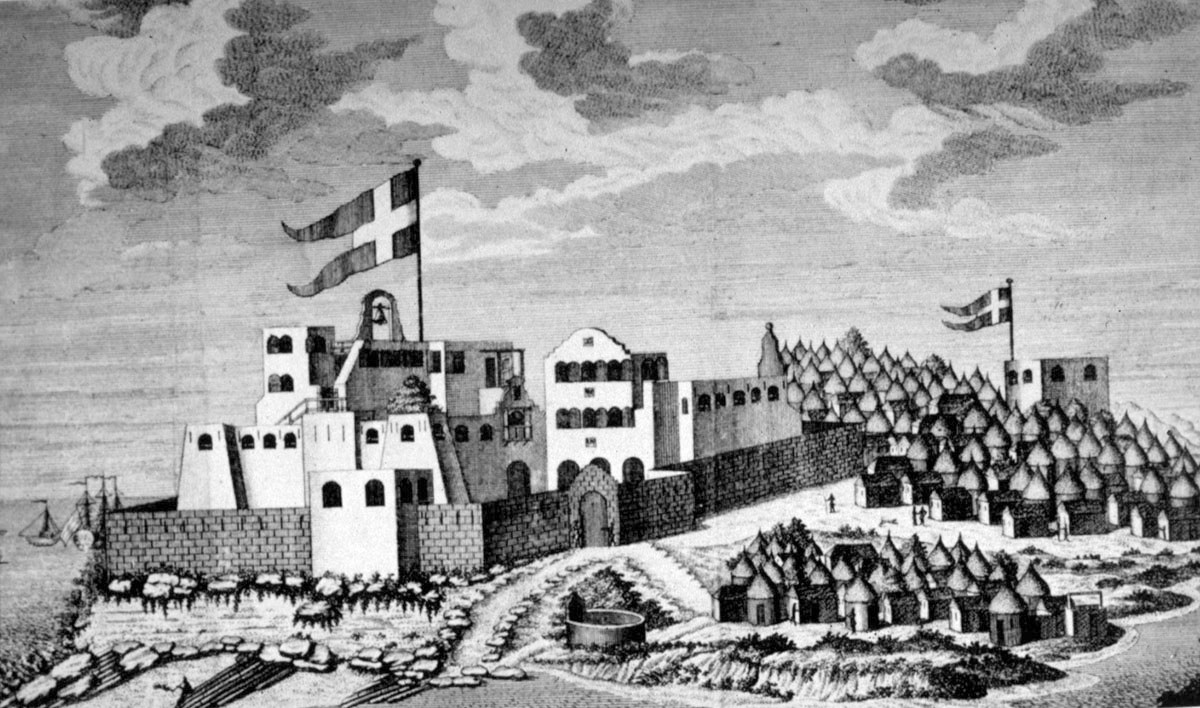
A contemporary depiction of Fort Christiansborg

Denmark-Norway maintained several trading stations and four forts along the Gold Coast in West Africa, especially around modern day Ghana. Three trading stations were built: Fort Frederiksborg, Kpompo; Fort Christiansborg near Accra in 1661, which was purchased from Sweden; and Frederiksberg. The forts were Fort Fredensborg (1734), Fort Kongenstein (1783), Fort Prinzenstein (1784), and Fort Augustaborg (1787), several of which exist as ruins today. Of these, only one is still in existence, the Osu Castle, which used to be the residence of Ghanaian presidents.

Plantations were established near Frederiksborg, but they failed. Fort Christiansborg became the base for Danish power in West Africa, and the centre for the slave trade to the Danish West Indies. In 1807, Denmark's African business partners were suppressed by the Ashanti, which led to the abandonment of all trading stations. Denmark sold its forts to the United Kingdom in 1850.

==== List ====
- Fort Fredensborg (Ningo: 1734 – March 1850)
- Fort Christiansborg (Accra/Osu: 1658 – April 1659, 1661 – Dec 1680, February 1683 – 1693, 1694–1850)
- Fort Augustaborg (Teshie: 1787 – March 1850)
- Fort Prinzenstein (Keta: 1780 – 12 March 1850)
- Fort Kongenstein (Ada: 1784 – March 1850)
- Fort Carlsborg (February 1658 – 16 April 1659, 22 April 1663 – 3 May 1664)
- Fort Frederiksborg (Amanful or Amanfro: 1659 – 16 April 1685)
- Fort William (Ghana) in Anomabu (1657–1659)
- Small base near Ningo from 1784 to 1850

=== Asia ===
Denmark maintained a scattering of small colonies and trading posts throughout the Indian sub-continent from the 17th to 19th centuries, after which most were sold or ceded to Britain which had become the dominant power there. The most important economic aspect was spice trade and access to the east Asian area, including Imperial China situated farther to the east.

==== Tranquebar (1620–1845) ====
Map of Danish Settlements in India (1620 - 1845).

The colony at Trankebar (modern day: Tharangambadi) was kept for over 200 years, with a few interruptions, until it was sold to the British in 1845.

==== Serampore (1755–1845) ====
In 1755, Denmark acquired the Frederiksnagore (now Serampore), and later the towns of Achne and Pirapur. They are located about 25 kilometres (16 mi) north of Kolkata (formerly Calcutta). In 1818, Serampore College was established in Serampore, which still exists today. These towns were also sold to Britain in 1845.

==== Nicobar Islands (1756–1848/1868) ====
There were also colonization attempts of the Nicobar Islands, called Frederiksøerne ("Frederik Islands") or Ny Danmark ("New Denmark") by the Danes between 1754 and 1868.

=== Europe ===
==== Iceland (1537/1814–1944) ====
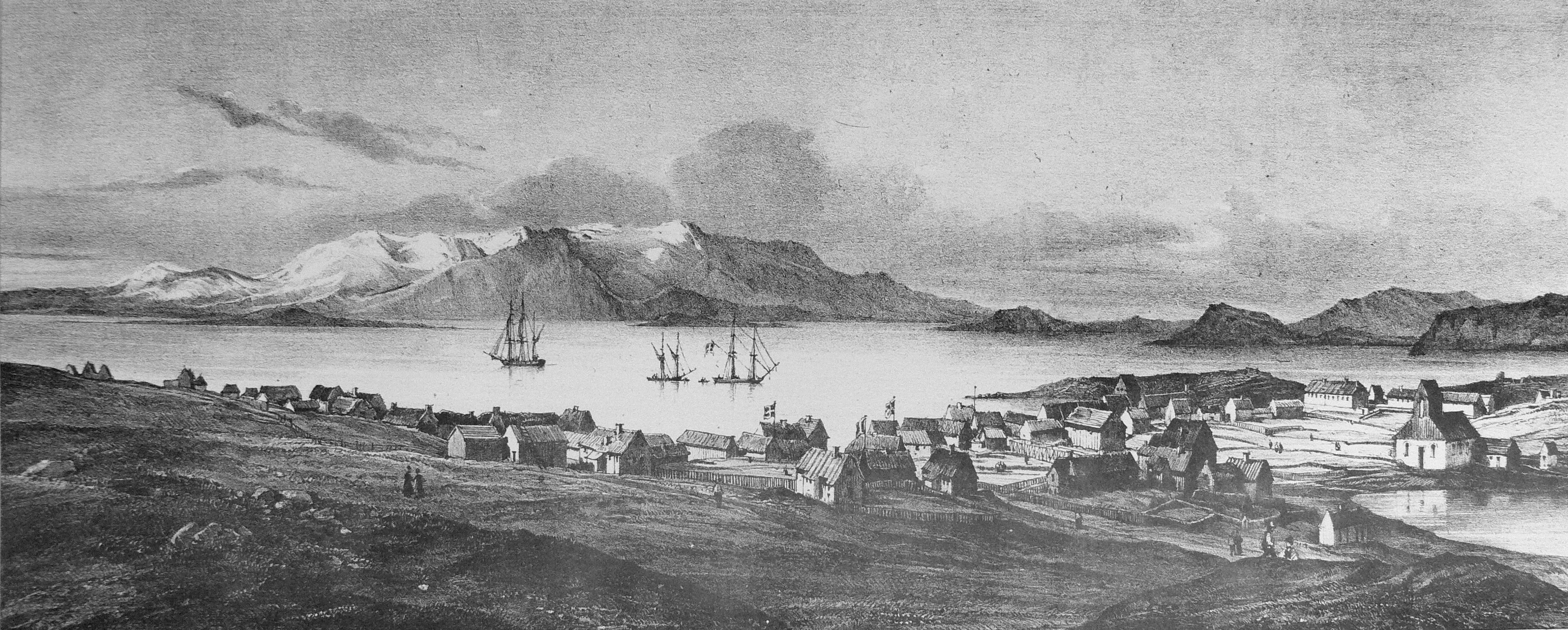
Reykjavík in 1835

As with Greenland and the Faroe Islands, Norwegian claims to Iceland were inherited by Denmark–Norway. Also like those possessions, Iceland was retained by Denmark at the Treaty of Kiel. A growing independence movement in Iceland led to Denmark granting it home rule in 1874 and expanding that home rule in 1904. In 1918, Iceland became a fully sovereign kingdom, titled the "Kingdom of Iceland", in personal union with Denmark.

During Nazi Germany's occupation of Denmark from 1940 to 1945, the Republic of Iceland was declared on 17 June 1944 after the result of a referendum.

==== Faroe Islands (1537/1814–1851) ====
As with Greenland, Denmark–Norway inherited the medieval Norwegian claims to the Faroe Islands as the successor state to Norway. The Faroes had become part of the Kingdom of Norway in 1035. After Denmark-Norway was dissolved, Norway was given to Sweden after the Napoleonic Wars; Denmark however retained the dependencies of the Norwegian crown, and the Faroes were retained as a condition of the Treaty of Kiel in 1814. In 1816, the islands were officially established as a Danish county (amt), and the local parliament (løgting) was abolished. The Faroe Islands were fully incorporated into Denmark in 1851 with the implementation of the Danish constitution, where the islands were given equal voting rights and were treated as any other province in the country, removing its colonial status.

=== North America ===
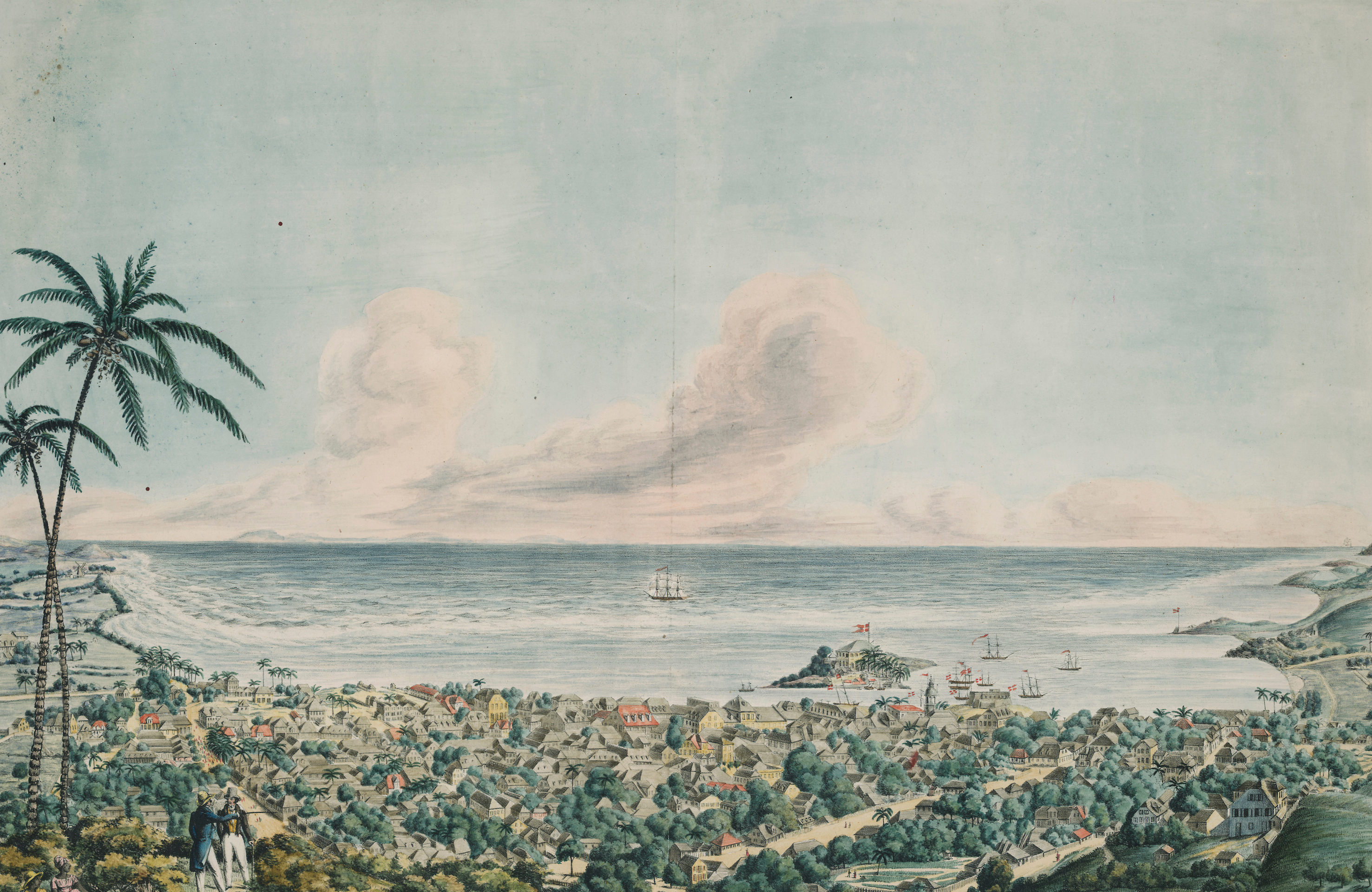
Christiansted in the Danish West Indies, 1831

==== Danish West Indies (1666–1917) ====
Denmark–Norway acquired the island of St. Thomas in 1671 and St. Jan (now St. John) in 1718, and bought St. Croix from France in 1733. All of the islands' economies were based primarily on sugar. These islands were known as the Danish West Indies and were eventually sold to the United States in 1917 for 25 million dollars. Several Danish-American succession talks had been made since 1870 due to a rising number of riots and unrest from the poorer English-speaking population. The Zahle Government (1914–1920) held a heavily boycotted election for Danish mainland constituencies, which produced a minority for the sale of the islands. The United States hoped to use them as naval bases. Since 1917, the islands have been known as the United States Virgin Islands.

==== Greenland (1814–1953) ====
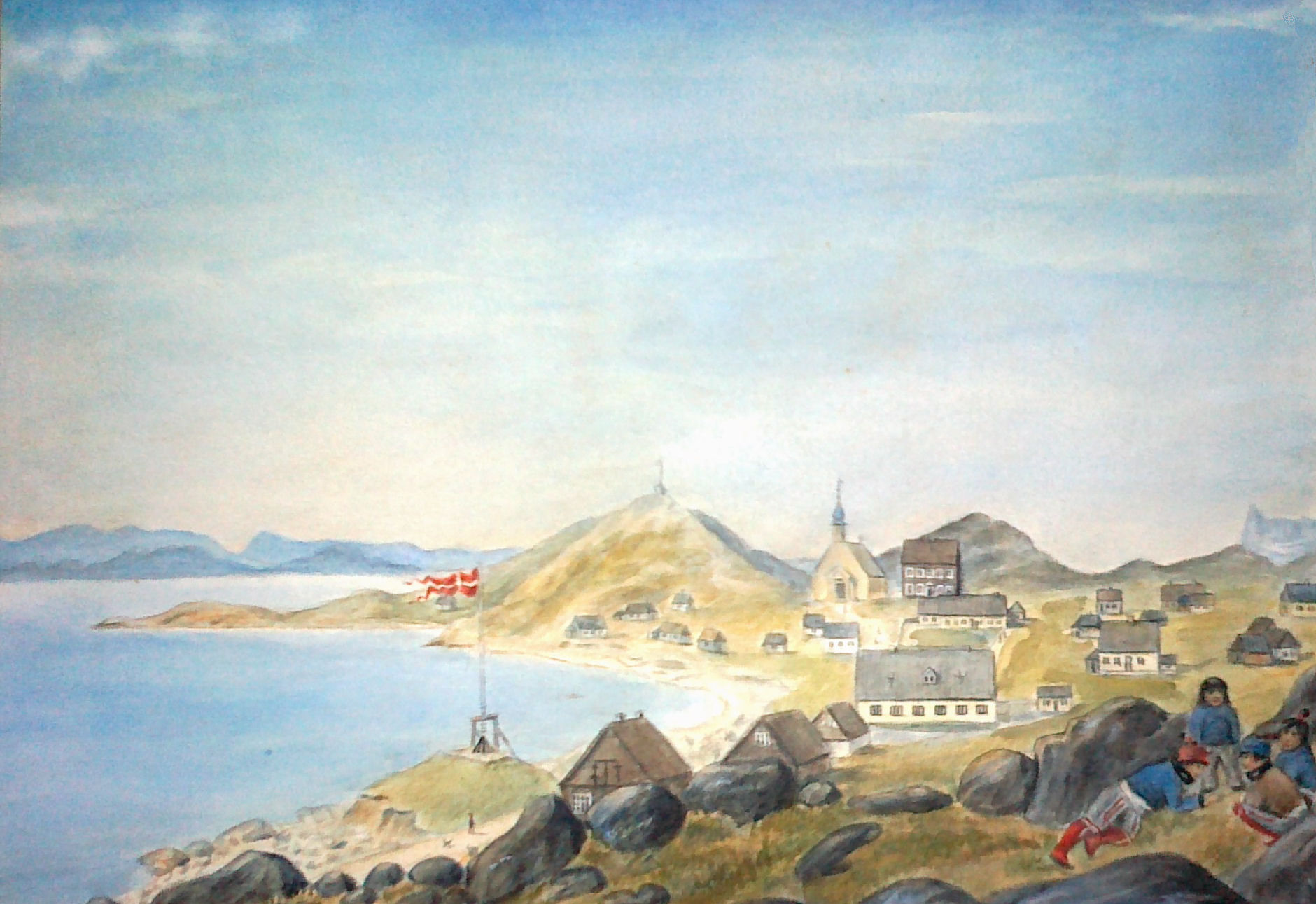
Godthåb in Greenland, c. 1878

Greenland was settled by immigrants from Iceland and Norway in the Viking Age after the arrival of Erik the Red in 995 or 996. Medieval Greenland was a bishopric with 22 churches and 2 convents under the archdiocese of Nidaros. In 1261, the Greenlanders became subjects of the Kingdom of Norway (872–1397). With the ratification of the Kalmar Union in 1397, Denmark–Norway inherited Greenland. After the Norse settlement in Greenland finally disappeared in the 15th century, Europeans did not settle the island again until 1721, when the Lutheran minister Hans Egede arrived and established the town now known as Nuuk. After Norway was ceded to the king of Sweden in 1814 following the Napoleonic Wars, Denmark retained the old territorial claims as a condition of the Treaty of Kiel.

The development and settlement of Greenland accelerated in 1945, instigated by the region's geostrategic importance in the Cold War era, itself exemplified and manifested by the U.S. Air Base of Thule from 1943. Another reason and driving force was the emergence of fundamental technical abilities, such as aircraft and icebreakers at Greenland's disposition, giving the otherwise remote island a supply situation somewhat similar to Europe.

Following a period of increasing integration in the 19th century, Greenland was incorporated into Denmark in 1953 with the implementation of the Danish constitution.

== Legacy ==
Greenland and the Faroe Islands were the last vestiges of the colonial empire. Greenland's colonial status ceased in 1953, becoming an integral part of the Kingdom of Denmark. It gained home rule in 1979 and further autonomy, including self-determination, in 2009. Likewise, the Faroes were incorporated into the Kingdom in 1816, with the status of a county, and then given home rule in 1948.
