= Fort Prinzenstein =

Danish fort in Keta, Ghana

Coordinates: 5°55′18″N 0°59′37″E

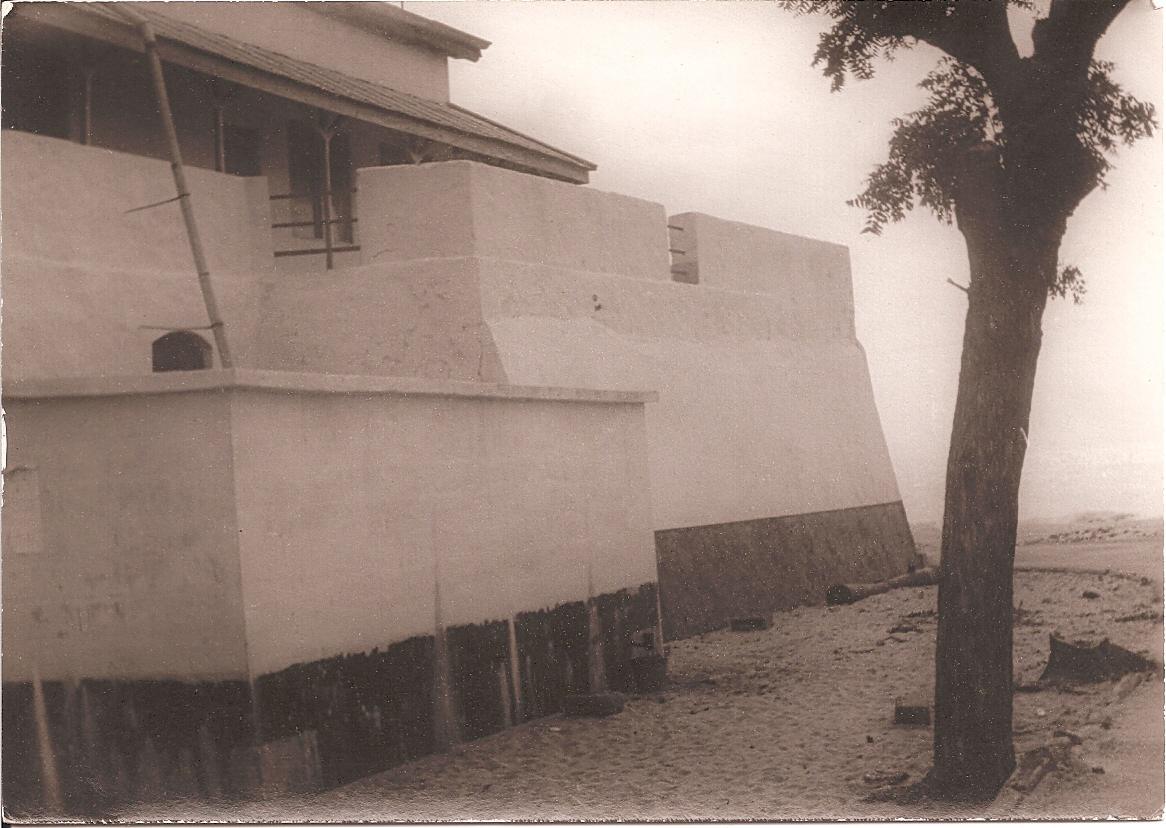
- Fort Prinzestein in 1970
- Interactive map of Fort Prinzenstein
- Location: Keta, Ghana

History
- Built: 1784

UNESCO World Heritage Site
- Type: Cultural
- Criteria: vi
- Designated: 1979
- Part of: Forts and Castles, Volta, Greater Accra, Central and Western Regions
- Reference no.: 34

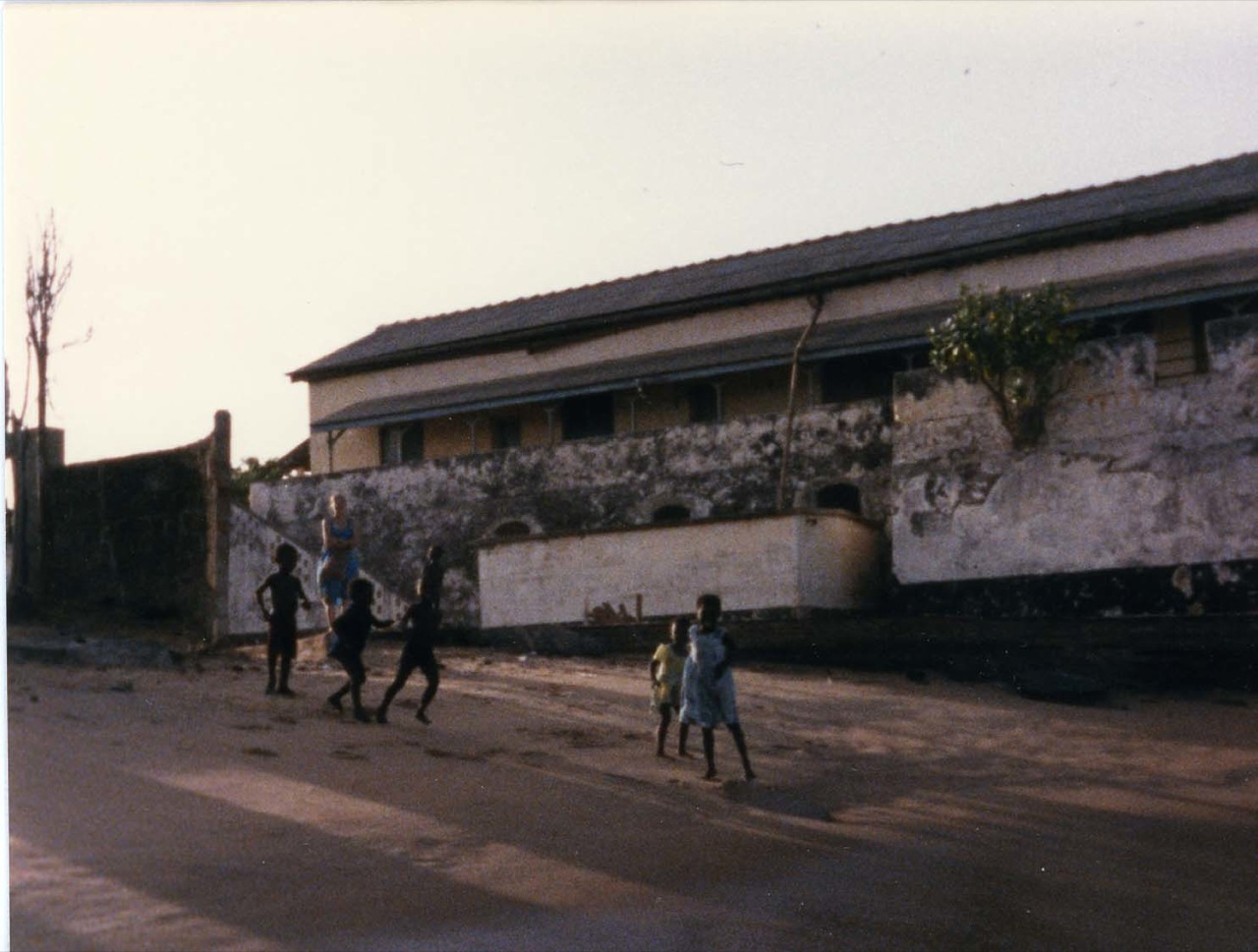
The main building before the major erosion started in mid 1980s

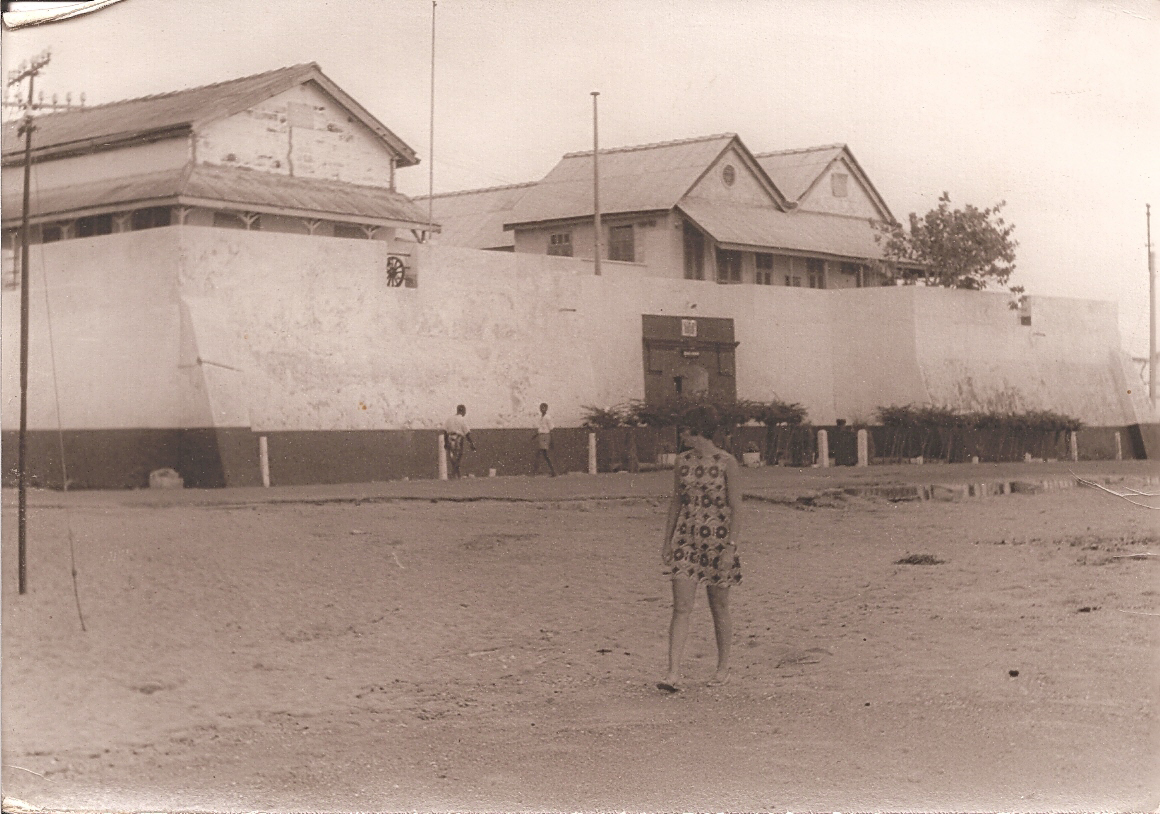
Fort Prinzestein (image 1) in 1970

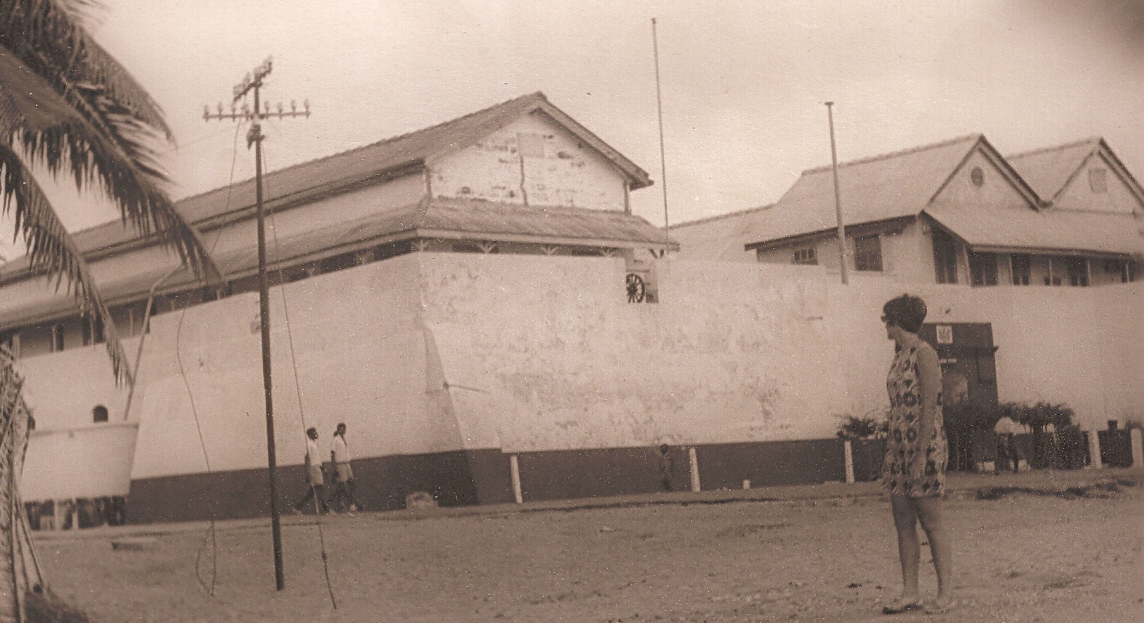
Fort Prinzestein (image 3) in 1970

Fort Prinzenstein (Danish: Fort Prinsensten) is a fort located at Keta, Ghana, which was used in the slave trade. Many such forts were built in Africa, but Prinzenstein is one of the few that lie east of the Volta River. Keta served as an open port until the Tema Harbour commenced its operation to the west in 1962. The fort has been designated a World Heritage Site (along with several other castles and forts in Ghana) because of its historical importance and testimony to the Atlantic slave trade.

It was built by Danish traders in 1784 for defensive purposes after the Sagbadre War against the Anlo Ewe and to keep the area safe from other colonial powers. The majority of the materials, especially the stone used for the building of the fort, came from Accra. The fort is among the four major structures that were built by the Danish. The fort significantly played an important part in the slave trade, which involved Europeans in West Africa. Aside from the slave trade, the fort served an active purpose in the trade of imported and exported goods such as gold and ivory in a give-and-take for muskets, brandy, iron rods, textiles, cowries shells etc.

== History ==
The Dutch West India Company had built Fort Singelenburgh at the site of the current fort in 1734, but the Dutch abandoned the fort in 1737, probably because of the Dutch siding with the defeated Akwamu in the Akyem-Akwamu conflict. The Danish had developed a presence in Keta, the commercial capital of the Anlo people. However, in 1783 when the Anlo people pillaged the local Danish agent, the Governor of Christiansborg raised an army drawn from people with a tradition of antipathy towards the Anlo: the Ada, Akwapim, Ga and Krobo. The Danes were thus able to defeat the Anlo and impose a treaty in 1784 which allowed them to build Fort Prinzenstein and obliged the Anlo to trade only with them.

Up until 1803, the fort was used as a dungeon for slaves awaiting transportation to the Caribbean. In 1850 the fort, along with the rest of the Danish Gold Coast was sold to Britain. This was when Keta became a British colony. The fort was used as a prison for a period before it was partially destroyed by the sea in 1980. In an effort to protect the remains of the fort, the ICOMOS Ghana in collaboration with the Ghana Museum and Monuments Board and the Danish Embassy in 1991 made some effort towards preserving it, however the impact of the sea on the fort continued. The remains of the fort are now visited by tourists. The fort is visited by tourists from different parts of the world such as the United Kingdom, United States, Germany, Benin, France, Ireland, Norway, Switzerland, Sweden, Denmark and Finland.

== Present fort ==
The remains of the fort (September, 2012)

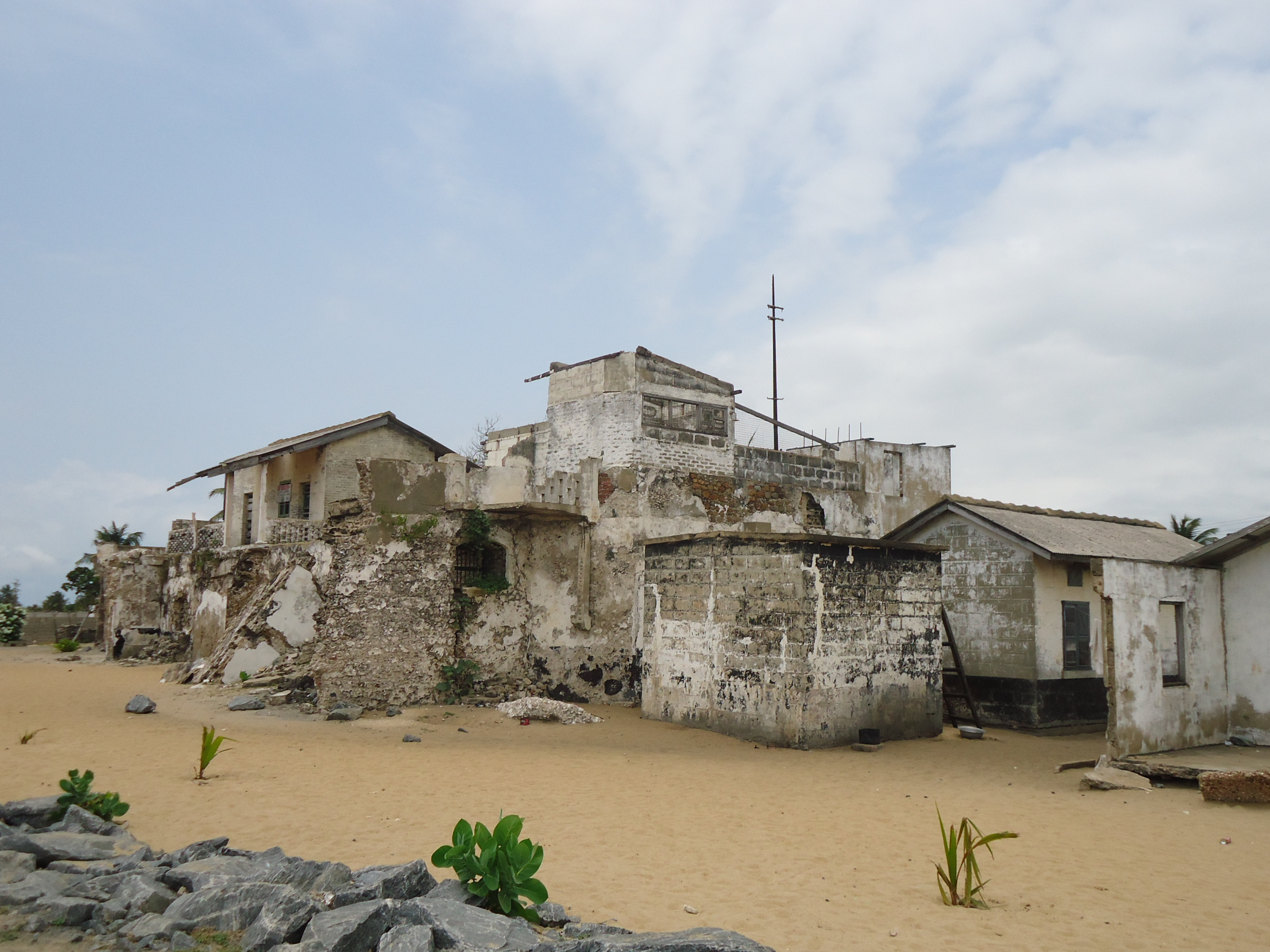

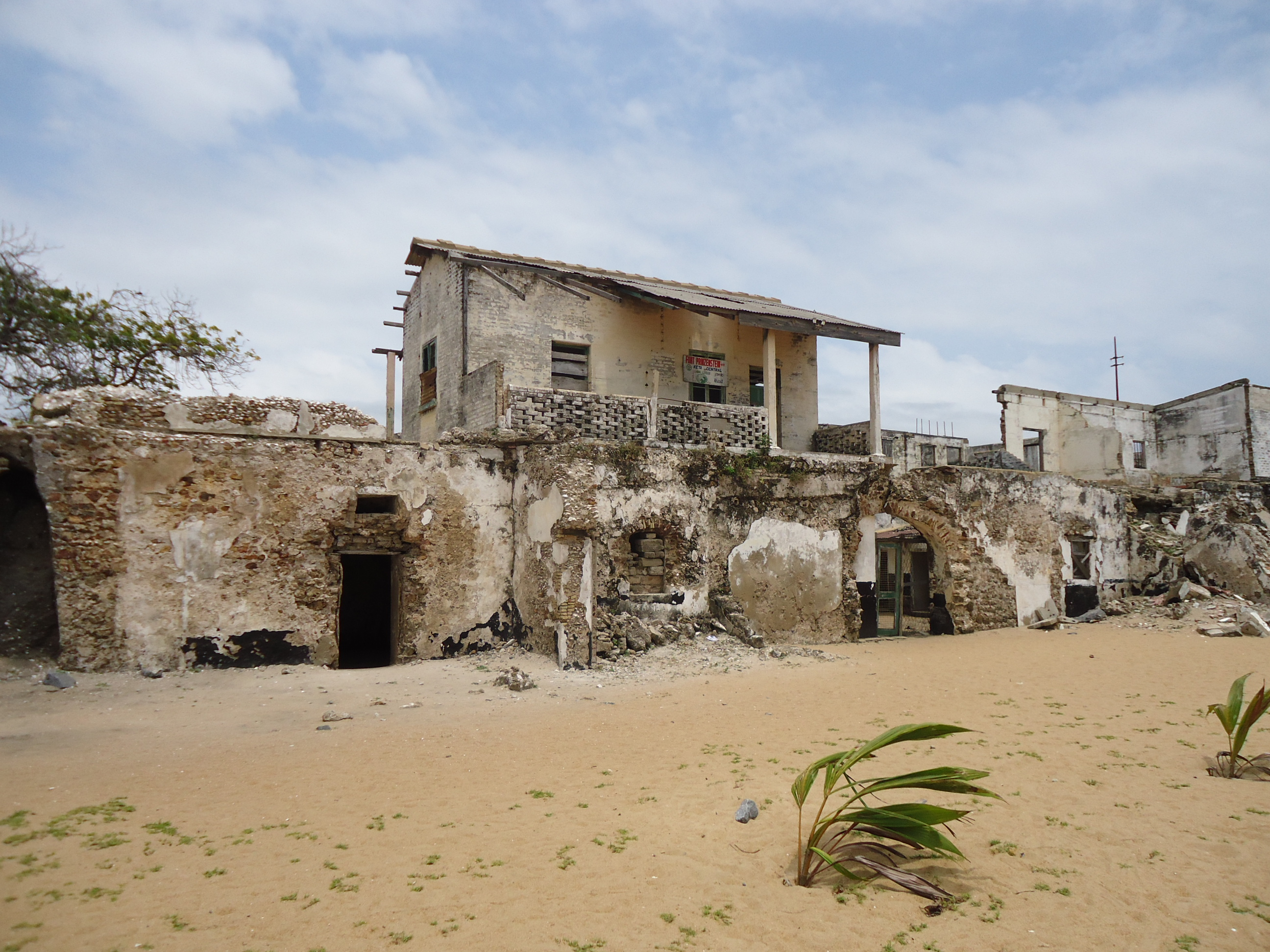

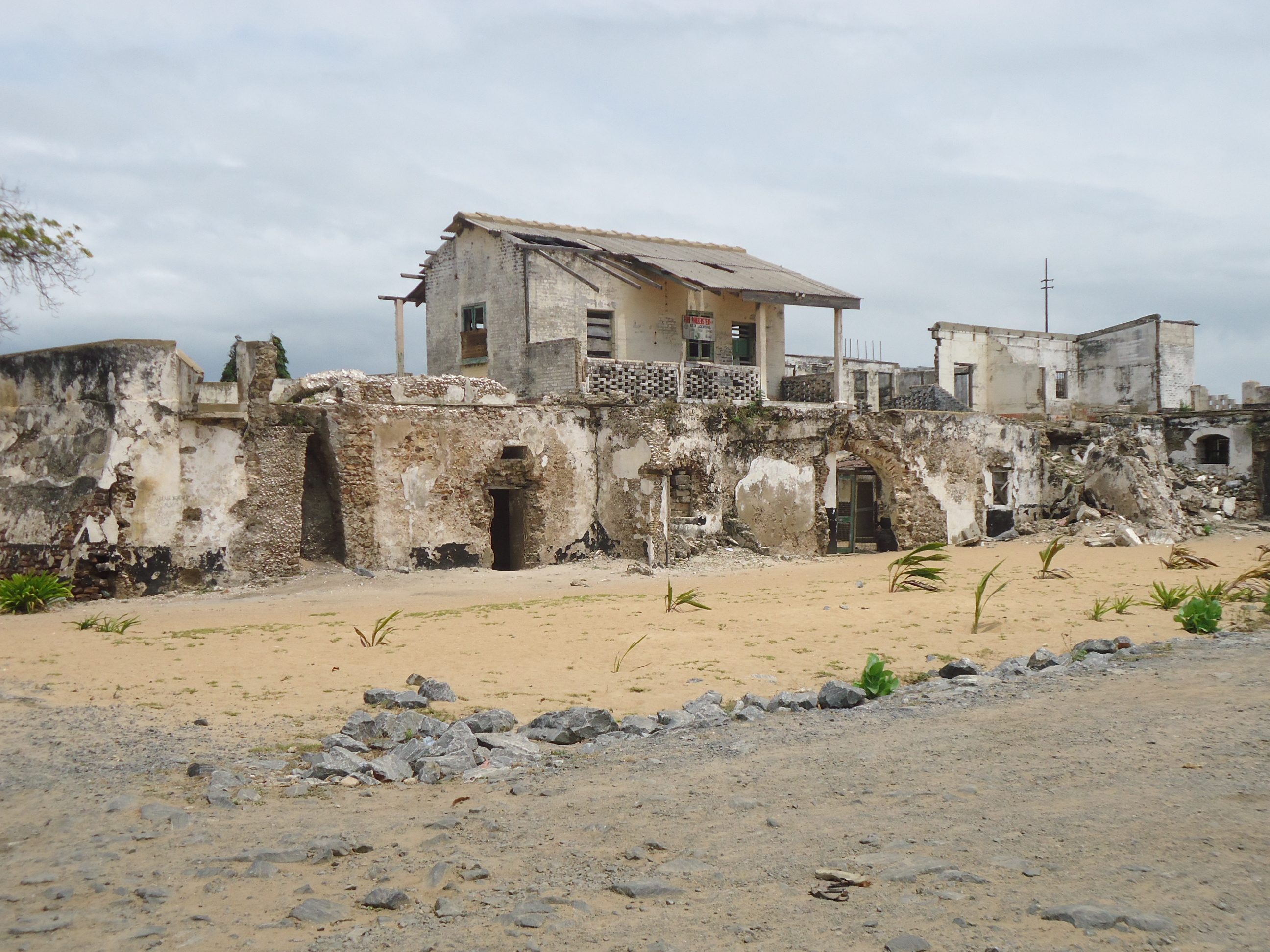

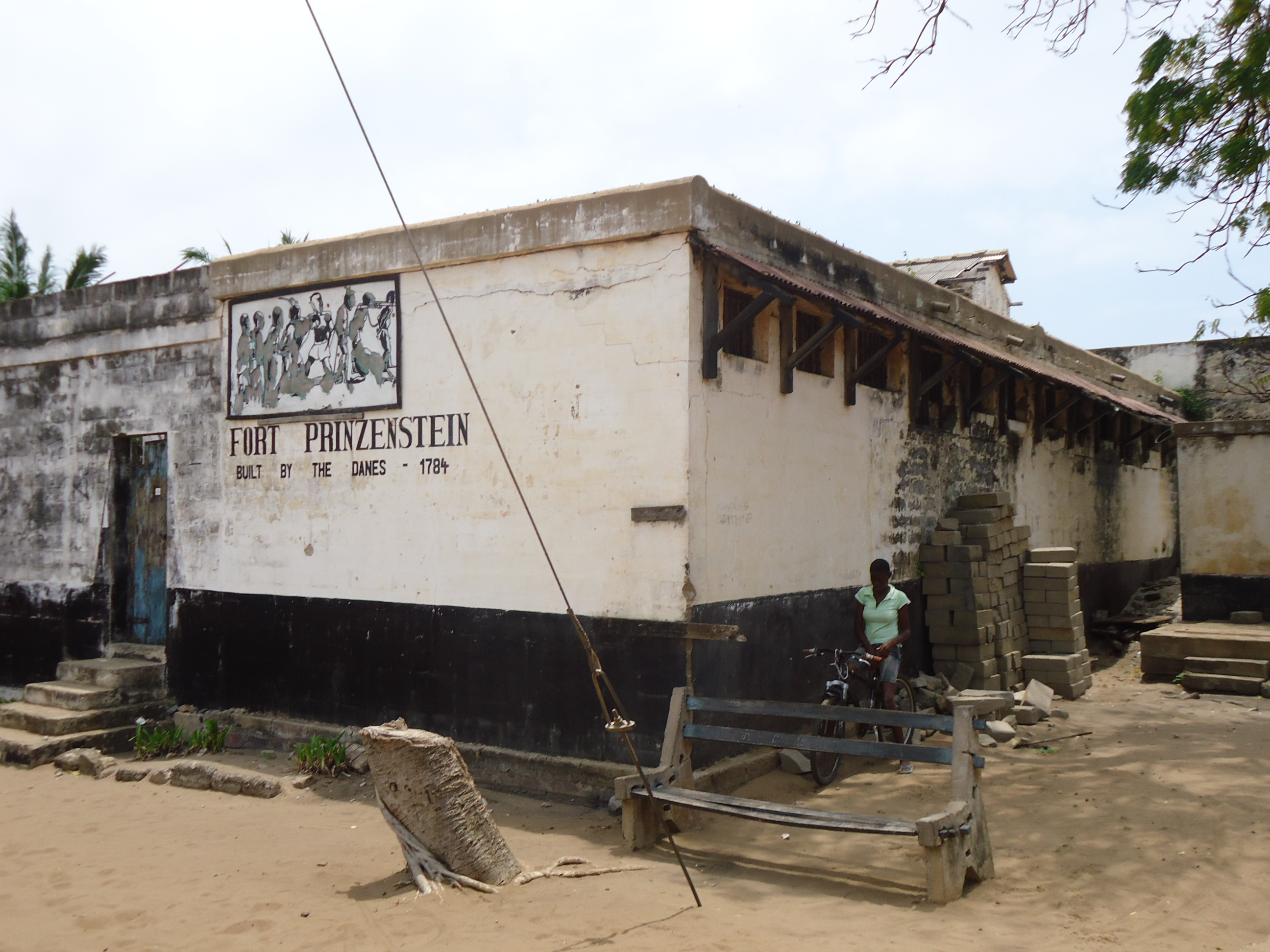

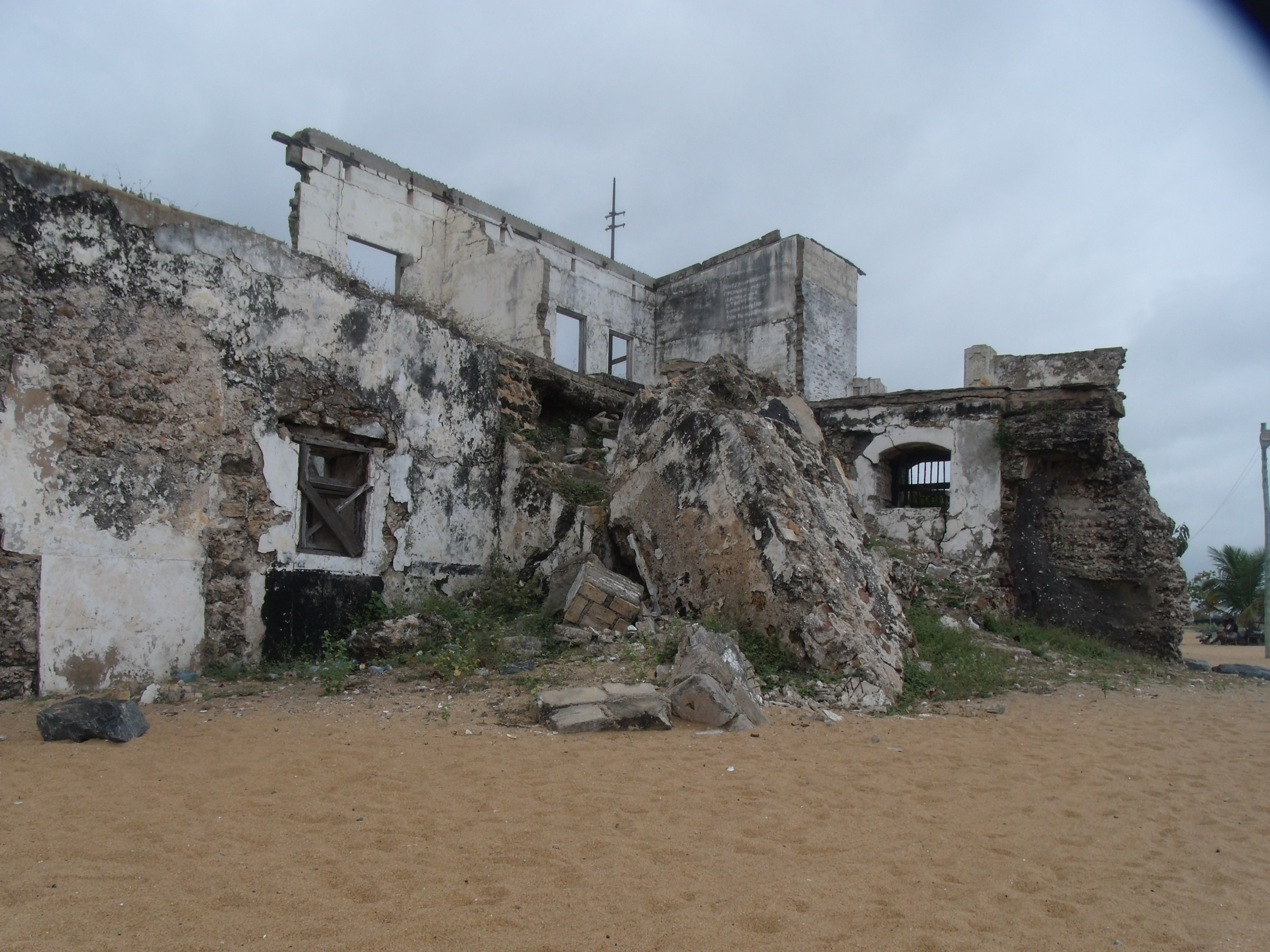

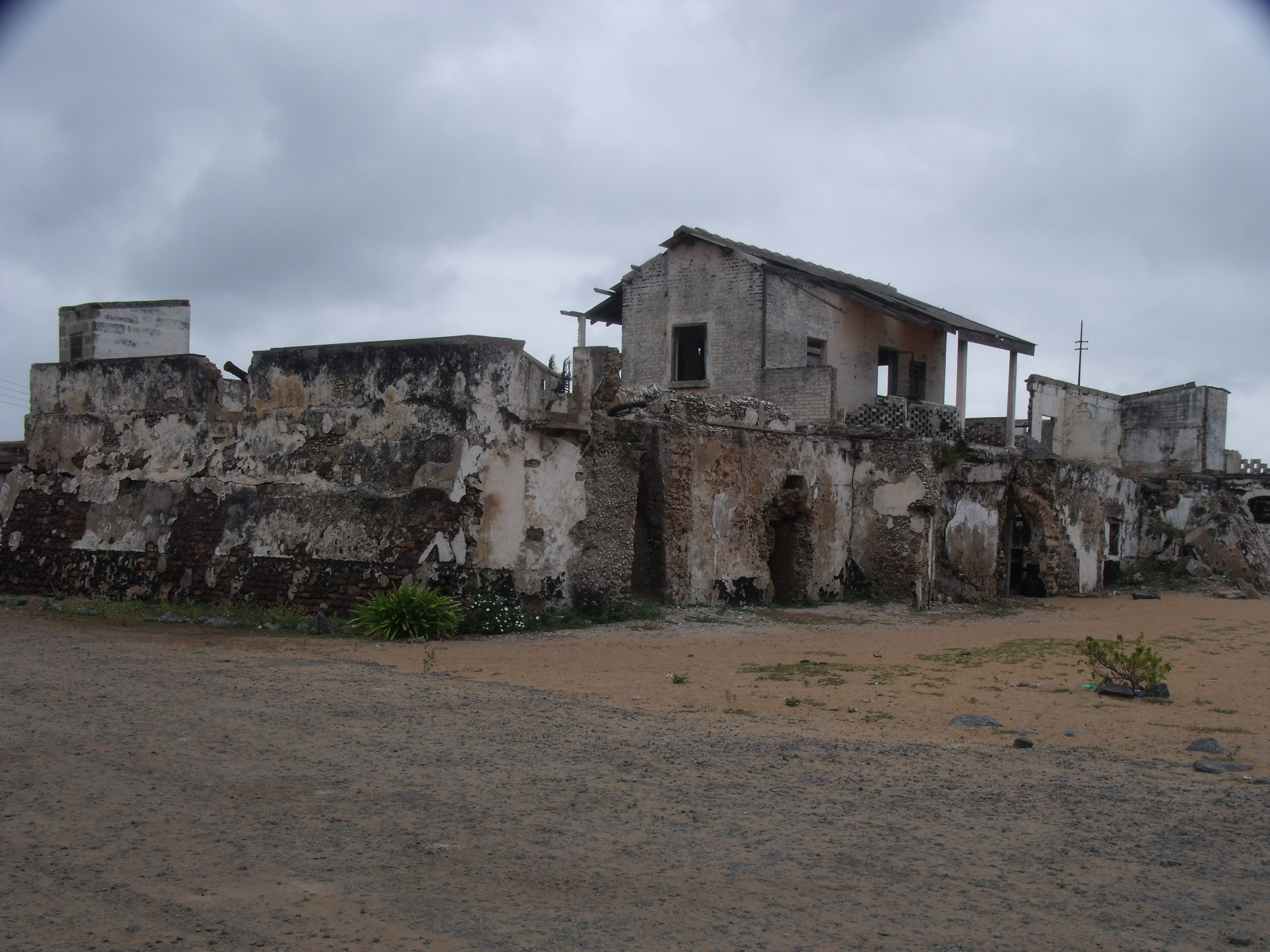

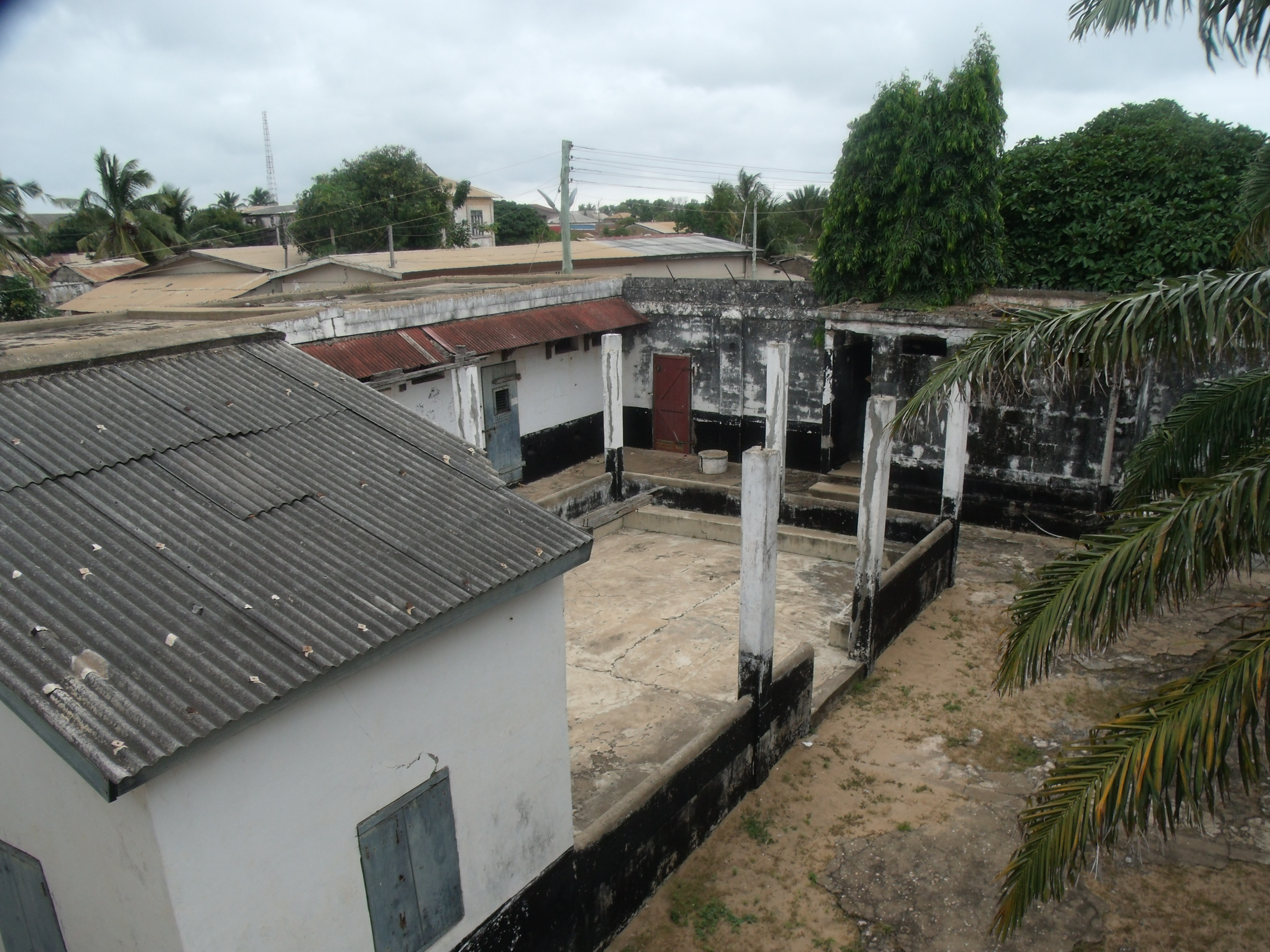

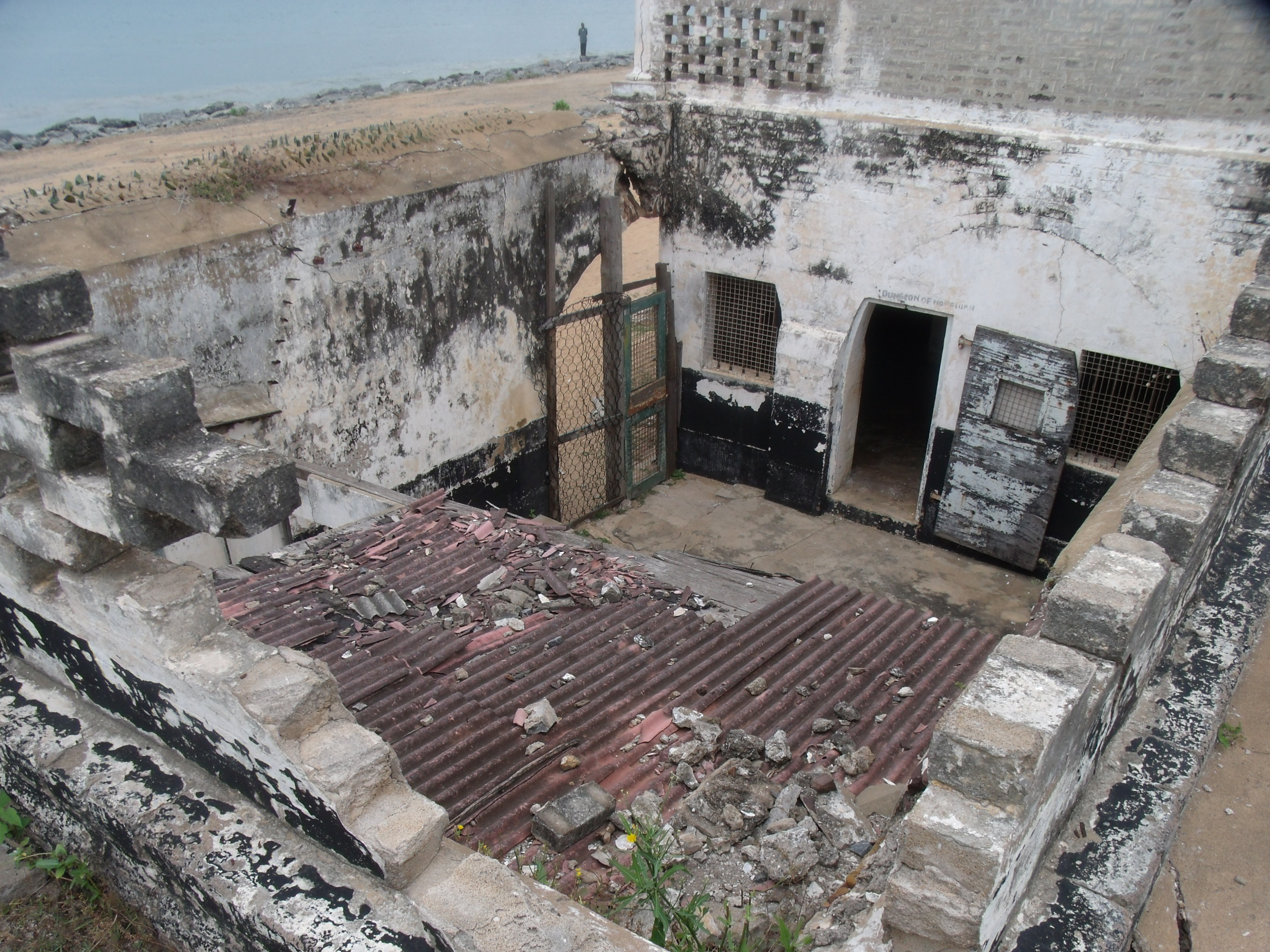
