= Sagbadre War =

1784 Danish punitive expedition in Gold Coast

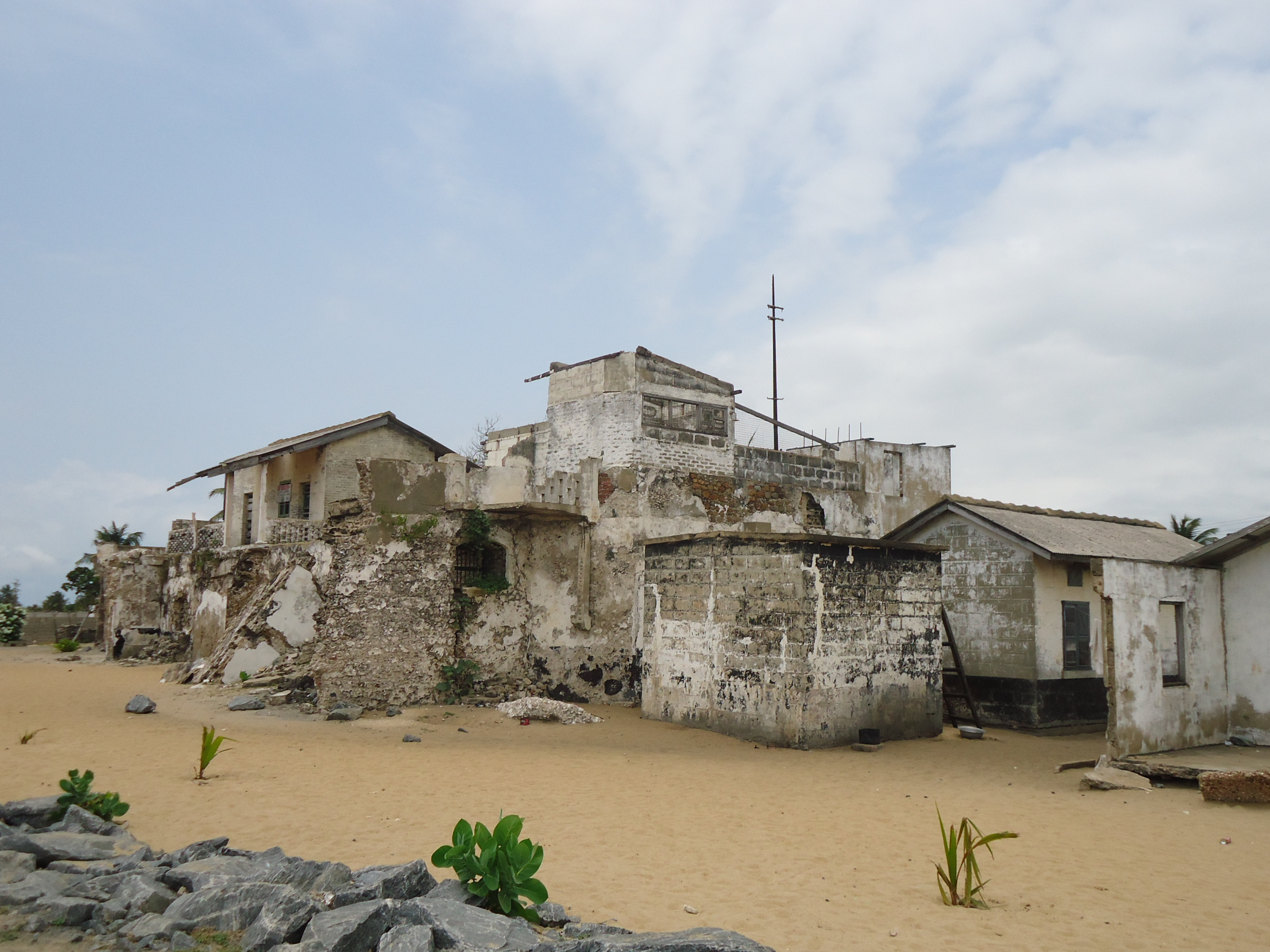
- Fort Prinzenstein, constructed after the war
Date	March 30 – June 18, 1784
Location	Gold Coast
Result	Ada-Danish victory
Territorial changes	Construction of Fort Prinzenstein

Belligerents
(Denmark–Norway) Ada-Danish Alliance Members: Danish West India Company Little Popo Ada Accra Akuapem Akwapim Ga Krobo	Anlo Confederacy; Anlo; Keta

Commanders and leaders
(Denmark–Norway) Oto Brafo (Denmark–Norway) Governor Kiøge	Adagla

Strength
4,000; 115 canoes	Unknown

The Sagbadre War was a brief punitive expedition carried out by Denmark-Norway and its native allies against the Anlo Ewe.

The war gets its name from a Danish official nicknamed Sagbadre, meaning "gulp" or "swallow" in Ewe, who was mistreated by the Anlo Ewe. This incident, along with various raids made into Danish-Norwegian territory against Ada in 1783, were used as justification by Danish-Norwegian Governor Kiøge to launch an expedition against Anlo in order to secure trade rights.

Anlo had previously acquired a significant amount of territory from its neighbours in various wars, and knowing this the Danish-Norwegians sought to form an overwhelming alliance in order to effectively crush Anlo.

The resulting force numbered 4,000 in total, with Little Popo contributing the most troops at 1,100, and Denmark-Norway contributing only a handful, and Oto Brafo, Chief of Osu, acting as commander. These included Governor Kiøge himself, and Paul Erdmann Isert, who would later go on to write about his experience in the conflict.

The Ada-Danish Alliance opened the campaign by sailing along the Volta River on war canoes mounted with Dane guns. While Isert admitted the Anlo showed advanced tactics, they were no match for the sheer force of the Alliance. Keta, who had initially started off the war on the side of Anlo, abandoned their ally when it became apparent the allies were winning.

During the course of the conflict the towns of Woe, Tegbi and Pottebra were razed, culminating in the razing of the Anlo capitol Anloga as the Danes lost control of their native troops. Although many Anlo defenders had fled Anloga in advance of the alliance, the defenders managed to inflict casualties upon the allies with Isert reporting 40 natives wounded and several killed, including some who committed suicide believing the battle to be lost. Isert asserts that Anlo Ewe casualties were heavier, with at least 13 being decapitated. Anlogan Civilians fled to Veta and Klikor.

In Ofoly Bussum, Prince of Glidji, negotiated a treaty with the Anlo Ewe on June 18. The treaty returned territory Anlo had previously acquired from all allied tribes and secured a Danish-Norwegian trade monopoly as well as the construction of Fort Prinzenstein. The warriors of Little Popo guarded the fort's construction, and Prince Ofoly Bussum received a monthly sum from it thereafter.

Anlo commander Adagla drowned himself in a river rather than return home from defeat.

== See also ==
- List of conflicts in Ghana
- List of wars involving Denmark
- List of wars involving Norway
