= Ashanti–Fante War =

War between Ashantis and Fantes

- Part of the Anglo-Ashanti Wars
Date	1806–1807
Location	Present-day Republic of Ghana
Result	Ashanti-Dutch victory

Belligerents
Ashanti Empire (Netherlands) Holland	Fante Confederacy; United Kingdom

Commanders and leaders
(Ashanti Empire) Osei Bonsu	Kodwo Otibu

The Ashanti–Fante War (1806–1807) was a war fought between the Ashanti Empire and the Fante Confederacy in the region of what is currently the Republic of Ghana.

== Background and the course of the war ==
In 1806, the Asantehene, Osei Bonsu, brought charges of grave robbing on some of his subjects who ran from Kumasi to Assin. Fleeing Ashanti lands, these suspected grave robbers were granted refuge by the Fante. Osei Bonsu sent out envoys to the Fante state of Abura for harboring fugitives. The last envoys were murdered by the Fante. Osei Bonsu declared war in response. The Ashanti sacked Abura in May 1806. The Ashanti later attacked the British fort at Anomabu on 15 June 1807 for protecting the Ashanti fugitives who had fled there. 8000 of the 1500 Fante at Anomabu were slain by 16 June. The Ashanti tried to capture the British fort with significant losses. British governor Torrane surrendered the fort to the Ashanti siege and diplomatic reconciliation took place between Torrane and Osei Bonsu on 25 June. The surviving Fante chiefs swore allegiance to the Asantehene.

== Aftermath of war ==
Ashanti–Fante War breaks out

This war, also known as the Ghana War, begins between the Ashanti associate degree Fante Confederacies of present–day Ghana. The Ashanti had resisted any attempt by Europeans, chiefly the British, to colonize them, and aligned themselves with the Dutch to limit British influence within the region. However, the British still annexed neighboring areas, together with the Fante, and also the subsequent conflicts eventually increased into the war of 1806, during which the Ashanti were victorious. In 1811, the Ga–Fante War sees the defeat of the Ashanti, though they still capture a British fort. In 1814 the Ashanti launch an invasion of the Gold Coast, totally routing the tribes allied with the Europeans.

First Anglo-Ashanti War begins in West Africa War begins between the United Kingdom and the Ashanti. With the occurrence of the Ashanti–Fante War in 1806, the groups that had been allied with the Fante people against the Ashanti like the Ga people, leading a series of wars, and the Ashanti, allied with the Dutch, tried to limit European, particularly British power within the region of the Gold Coast. A series of forts were designed by the British Government in the region from 1821 and the Ashanti planned to invade and capture. In 1824 their forces surrounded a smaller army of around 1,000 British troops under the governor of West Africa, General Sir Charles McCarthy, at Accra, defeating them and killing McCarthy. The series of correct wars between the Fante people and Ashanti begins in 1826, ending with a pact in 1831, however breaking out once more in 1873.

== See also ==
- Ashanti Empire
- Ga–Fante War
