= Ga–Fante War =

1811 military conflict

The Ga–Fante War in 1811 was a war fought by the Ashanti Empire. The war was started when an Ashanti ally started a war against the Fante Confederacy, and resulted in victory, albeit an inconclusive one, for the Ashanti. The Fante enjoyed significant material and military support from the British throughout the early stages of the war.

It involved a series of battles between the Ashanti, also known as Asante, and their allies, the Ga people of Accra, against an alliance of the rival Akan states of the Fante. In a series of conflicts, the Ashanti won the initial battles but were unable to hold their gains due to the adoption of asymmetrical tactics by the Fante. Despite being eventually forced to withdraw, the Ashanti managed to capture a British fort at Tantamkweri.

== See also ==
- Ashanti-Fante War
