= 1956 British Togoland status plebiscite =

9 May 1956

Results
Choice	Votes	%
Integration with Ghana	93,095	57.97%
UN Trust Territory	67,492	42.03%
Valid votes	160,587	100.00%
Invalid or blank votes	0	0.00%
Total votes	160,587	100.00%
Registered voters/turnout	194,230	82.68%
- Results by local council

A plebiscite was held in British Togoland on 9 May 1956 to decide the status of the territory. Since World War I, the territory had been a League of Nations mandate under British control, and became a United Nations Trust Territory after World War II. The referendum offered residents the choice of remaining a Trust Territory until neighbouring French Togoland had decided upon its future, or becoming part of soon-to-be Ghana. The Ewe-based Togoland Congress campaigned against and preferred amalgamation with French Togoland.

The eventual result was reported to be 58% in favour of integration, although 55% of voters in the southern part of the territory had voted to separate from the Gold Coast and continue its status as a UN Trusteeship.

== Results ==
Choice	Votes	%
Integration with Ghana	93,095	58.0
UN Trusteeship	67,492	42.0
Invalid/blank votes		–
Total	160,587	100
Registered voters/turnout	194,230	82.7
Source: United Nations

== See also ==
- Western Togoland
