= British Togoland =

British territory in West Africa (1916–1956)

Coordinates: 6.3953°N 0.4703°E

Togoland under United Kingdom Trusteeship
- 1916–1956
- Flag

- British Togoland (left) beside French Togoland (now Togo) (right)
- Status: Class B League of Nations mandate of the United Kingdom (1922-1946); United Nations trust territory under British administration (1946-1957)
- Capital: Ho
- Common languages: English, French, Ewe, Gur, and Ghana-Togo
- History
  - Occupation: 27 August 1914
  - Partitioning: 27 December 1916
  - Admission by the Gold Coast: 27 December 1916 – 13 December 1956
  - League of Nations mandate: 20 July 1922 – 20 April 1946
  - U. N. Trust Territory: 13 December 1946 – 6 March 1957
  - Addition to the Gold Coast: 13 December 1956
  - Annexed to Her Majesty's dominions to form part of the Dominion of Ghana: 6 March 1957
- Currency: British West African pound
Preceded by	Succeeded by
Togoland	Gold Coast (British colony)
- Today part of: Ghana

British Togoland, officially Togoland under British Mandate and later officially the Togoland under United Kingdom Trusteeship, was a territory in West Africa under the administration of the United Kingdom, which subsequently entered a union with Ghana, part of which became its Volta Region. The territory was effectively formed in 1916 by the splitting of the German protectorate of Togoland into two territories, French Togoland and British Togoland, during the First World War. Initially, it was a League of Nations Class B mandate. In 1922, British Togoland was formally placed under British rule, and French Togoland, now Togo, was placed under French rule.

After the Second World War, the political status of British Togoland changed. It became a United Nations Trust Territory but was still administered by the United Kingdom. During the decolonization of Africa, a status plebiscite was organised in British Togoland in May 1956 to decide the future of the territory; 58% of the voters taking part voted to merge the territory with the neighbouring British Crown colony of the Gold Coast, which was heading towards independence, rather than remain a trusteeship and await developments in French Togoland. On 13 December 1956, the United Nations General Assembly passed General Assembly resolution 1044 on "The future of Togoland under British administration". By that resolution, the UN acknowledged the outcome of the plebiscite held in the territory with a majority in favour of union with the Gold Coast. The resolution recommended that the United Kingdom effect the union of British Togoland with Gold Coast upon the independence of Gold Coast. To achieve that, the Ghana Independence Act 1957 had the United Kingdom annex British Togoland to form part of Her Majesty's dominions comprising the Dominion of Ghana.

In a letter dated 6 March 1957, the British government informed the Secretary-General of the United Nations that with effect from midnight 6 March 1957, under the terms of the Ghana Independence Act 1957, the territories previously comprised in the Gold Coast became the independent State of Ghana and that under the same Act, the union of the former Trust Territory of Togoland under British administration with the independent State of Ghana took place from the same time and date.

British Togoland's capital was Ho, which now serves as the capital of Volta Region. The region includes much of the former mandate's territory.

== United Nations trust territory ==
After World War II, the mandate became a United Nations trust territory administered by the United Kingdom. Prior to the mandate and trusteeship periods, British Togoland was administered as part of the adjoining territory of the Gold Coast, under the name of Trans-Volta Togo (TVT).

=== Togoland Congress ===
In 1954, the British government informed the UN that it would be unable to administer the Trust Territory after 1957. In response, in December 1955, the UN General Assembly passed a resolution advising the British government to hold a plebiscite on the future of British Togoland.

On 9 May 1956, this plebiscite was held under UN supervision with the choice between formal integration with the future independent Gold Coast or continuation as a Trust Territory.

The Togoland Congress campaigned against integration. There was vocal opposition to the incorporation of Togoland from the Ewe people who voted against in British Togoland, as the Ewe wanted the unification of the Ewe people in British Togoland and French Togoland as a separate Ewe state (modern Togo).

It was reported that the vote results was 42% against from the Ewe people (Togoland Congress), and 58% for integration.

== Orange Order ==
The Orange Order in Togo was established in 1915, during the First World War, when the country was under Anglo-French occupation following the defeat of German Togoland. The first lodge, Loyal Orange Lodge No. 867 “Defenders of Lomé”, was founded in Lomé by John Amate Atayi, a Togolese Christian who had previously been initiated into the Orange Order in Lagos, Nigeria.

Operating initially under the authority of the Grand Orange Lodge of England, the lodge provided a fraternal and religious association for local Protestants, colonial personnel, and West African members familiar with Orange traditions. The movement later spread to other parts of southern Togo, particularly among English-speaking Protestant communities.

== See also ==
- Western Togoland
