= Exodus of the Ewe from Notsé =

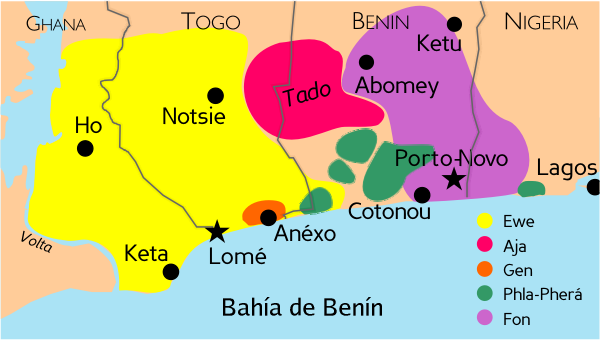
Linguistic map of the region, early 21st Century

The exodus of the Ewe from Notsé is an event that took place during the 16th-17th centuries, under the reign of the king of Notsé, Togbe Agorkoli (1670-1720). After founding a prosperous city-state in Notsé in the previous century, it gradually declined and soon came under the authority of Agokoli, who was known for his brutal and violent methods. In response to his tyranny, epitomized by his desire to erect a monumental sacred enclosure in Notsé, a number of the city's inhabitants decided to exile themselves and migrate westward to other regions of present-day Togo and Ghana. This migration is the genesis of the Ewe people, who number over ten million members by the early 21st century. It also gave rise to sub-groups of the Ewe people, such as the Agomé and the Waci.

Although the existence of this event is not disputed, the significance of the migration as the origin of the Ewe people is sometimes questioned, primarily due to a simplistic view of the events. This perspective is partly attributed to the German and French colonization of Togo and Ghana, where colonial historians and anthropologists paid little attention to and showed little interest in oral tradition data, leading to the assumption that important material has been lost. Moreover, it is possible that they documented this version for evangelization purposes, drawing parallels between the biblical Exodus narrative and that of the Ewe.

== History ==
=== Sources ===
The main sources of this account are elements from the oral tradition of the concerned peoples, which have been documented since the 19th century. Additionally, there are archaeological sources, such as the remaining enclosure in Notsé and the archaeological remains of the first identified Ewe people.

=== Background ===
The ancestors of the Ewe are believed to have been a people already present in the region of Togo and Ghana in the 13th century. However, it is difficult to trace their journey and evolution before their settlement in Notsé, where they founded a city and a prosperous kingdom in the 15th century. According to surviving oral traditions, they were guided to the site of Notsé by the hunter Afotsè, also known as Ndétsi, or under the leadership of an ancestor named Noin or Da. There, they merged with the already present populations and founded the city. Although it was prosperous and housed the regional sanctuary of the god Mawu, political troubles quickly erupted among the ruling classes of the city, weakening the priest-king. In the 17th century, one of these kings, Agokoli, took power after the death of his father, Ago. It seems that this king attempted to extend his restricted powers, purged his advisors, and replaced them with his supporters. He also reportedly erected a monumental enclosure wall in Notsé. Despite the religious reservations of several officials, who indicated hostility to the project from part of the population, especially since this construction had to be undertaken under difficult conditions due to the project's size, Agokoli persisted in his plans. This enclosure wall, discovered by archaeologists, is not a fortification wall but rather a religious and symbolic enclosure. In some traditional accounts, this enclosure is reinterpreted as being made of "human blood and clay".

Agokoli is a very negative figure among the Ewe people, although this portrayal as an exclusively negative and tyrannical king is possibly a later memorial reconstruction.

=== Migration ===
In response to these developments within Notsé, a number of inhabitants decided to follow their leaders and leave the city. The exodus occurred in two phases: first, there seemed to be a massive and generalized exodus of a significant portion of the urban population without Agokoli's approval. Then, in a second phase, families or groups wishing to follow the first exiles joined this initial wave of migration, this time probably with the sovereign's approval. In traditional accounts, the exiles are said to have breached the sacred enclosure with a rope, a deeply symbolic act, although in reality, the uncovered enclosure was not completed, making such an event unlikely. Most accounts indicate the city of Gamé, south of Notsé, as a gathering place for the exiles before they separated and dispersed throughout the region.

The Ewe split into three groups as a result of the dispersal. The first group went north-west and founded the towns of Hohoe, Kpandu, Peki, and Kpalimé among others. The second group went west and founded the town of Ho and those surrounding it. The third group went south-west along the coast and founded Bè (present day Lomé) and Anlo among others. They populated significant parts of Togo and Ghana, giving rise to the Ewe and their sub-groups, such as the Bè. It is estimated that it took approximately a century to reach the Togo coastline and settle in the Lomé region from Notsé.

=== Critiques and nuances ===
While the existence of Notsé and the migration are not questioned, the idea that it is the origin of the Ewe people is sometimes reconsidered. Indeed, the German colonizers who took over Togo in 1890 made choices among the oral traditions they collected. It is quite plausible that they selected the narratives that suited them best, and presenting a monolithic origin of the Ewe people undoubtedly served their purposes. Moreover, they might have documented this version for evangelization purposes, drawing parallels between the biblical Exodus and that of the Ewe. This narrative was thus widely propagated throughout the region by some German missionaries, and while Notsé holds a significant religious role among all Ewe, it appears that foundation stories linking their origin to Notsé were not universally shared before the spread of this narrative.

== Legacy ==
The exodus, which may not necessarily be the true origin of the people, is perceived as the genesis of the Ewe by its own members. It has gradually established itself among the Ewe as the beginning of their history.
