= Agbozume =

- Town
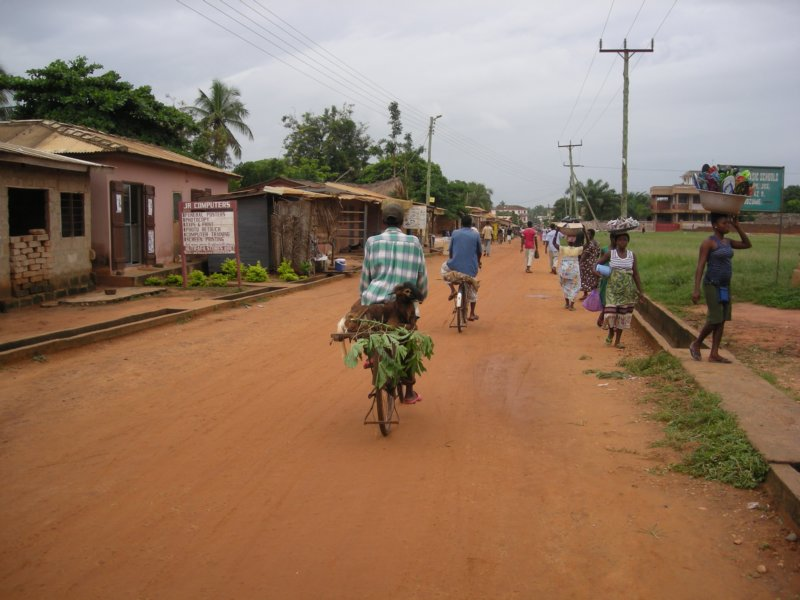

- Location in Ghana
- Coordinates: 6°4′N 1°2′E
- Country: Ghana
- Region: Volta Region
- District: Ketu South Municipal District
- Elevation: 12 m (39 ft)

Population (2009)
  - Total: 5,073
- Time zone: GMT
  - Summer (DST): GMT

Agbozume or Klikor-Agbozume is a town in Ketu Municipal District in the Volta Region of southeastern Ghana. The main language spoken is the Ewe language.

== History ==
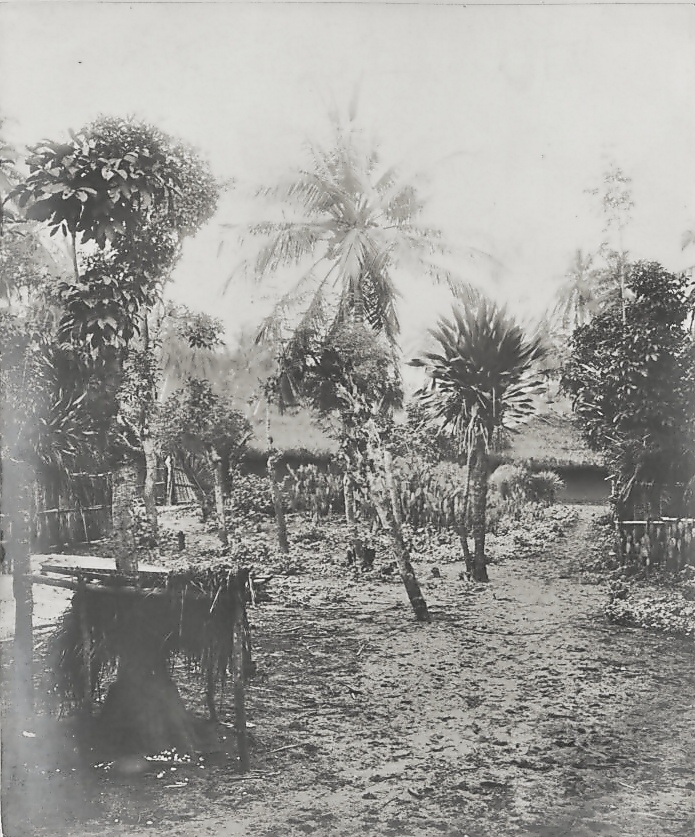
Fetish Temple of the Somey, Agbozume, 1890

Agbozume is a settlement of the Somey people, whose subordinate position to the Anlo was confirmed in 1912 when Francis Crowther, Secretary for Native Affairs in the Gold Coast included Agbozume in the Anlo State under his friend Togbi Sri II. Agbozume-Klikor is perceived to be a spiritually powerful town. Klikor has one the most powerful shrines in Ghana. They believe that the gods of Klikor protect them from evil. Even though the Trokosi culture practice has been abolished in most parts of the world, the people of Klikor still practice it.

Agbozume is the traditional capital of the Somey Ewes. They were the original people of Keta. Awanyedor and Akaga who were sons of Torgbui Wenya- the founder of Anlo State, left Anloga to found Keta as a fishing village. The Danes later built a fort in Keta (Fort Prizenstein = Prince’s stone Fort) after the Sagbadre War of 1784. That enabled Keta to flourish in commerce. A civil war between Keta and Anloga in the year 1794 initiated by the Danes culminated in the defeat of Keta. Majority of the Keta people escaped across the lagoon to Klikor and Agbozume was built partly on land granted by Klikor and also on land seized from the Whlis (Ewe for weaver birds), the original inhabitants who were defeated in war. Historically, the people of Keta were known as Agudzeawo (Easterners in old Ewe) because they are east of Anloga.

Etymology : Ewe language- Agbo dzo me

In the ram’s horns.

== Geography ==
Agbozume lies on the main road between Accra and the border with Togo. Aflao, a border town is about 20 km away from Agbozume, as well as the coast of the Gulf of Guinea. The town is adjacent to another place, Klikor, which is separated by only one path. The two settlements are often referred to together with Klikor-Agbozume.

== Economy ==
The town has a large market, which takes place every four days in rotation to the market days of Keta, Denu and Dzodze. The market is popular for the sale of Kente cloth where traders from Burkina Faso, Togo, Benin, and Nigeria come to buy the cloth and export it. On market days people from surrounding villages also come to Agbozume to trade various goods.

=== Protests ===
In December 2013, 600 residents from Agbozume took part in a protest against the Kesington Salt Factory, who they claimed had endangered their livelihoods by creating a crater to remove sand to build a road. This, they said had damaged the banks of the Keta Lagoon and created the threat of flooding. This used to be the largest salt mining in Volta Region.
