= Kingdom of Notsé =

The kingdom of Notsé (Ewe: Notsé Fiaɖuƒea; French: Royaume de Notsé) was a former kingdom that organized itself around the city of Notsé between the 15th and 18th centuries. This theocracy, led by a sacred-king, was founded around the 15th century and managed to gain significant importance within West Africa, notably by initiating the construction of the monumental walls of Notsé, a sacred enclosure intended to surround the entire sacred boundary of the city. However, after significant internal turmoil leading to the exodus of the Ewe from Notsé, considered by them as their origin, the kingdom gradually declined until it disappeared.

In the 19th century, German colonizers established a chieftaincy that collaborated with them in Notsé. This chieftaincy became prominent among the Ewe people and attempted to preserve the heritage of the kingdom of Notsé.

== History ==
The ancestors of the Ewe were likely a people already present in the region of Togo and Ghana in the 13th century. However, it is difficult to trace their journey and evolution before their settlement in Notsé, where they founded a prosperous city and kingdom during the 15th century. According to surviving oral traditions, they were guided to the site of Notsé by the hunter Afotsè, also called Ndétsi, or under the leadership of an ancestor named Noin or Da. There, they merged with the populations already present in the area and founded the city. The kingdom was ruled by a sacred-king, who succeeded hereditarily from father to son. The priest-kings of Notsé bore facial scarifications, often representing leopard claws, a sacred animal.

In the 17th or 18th century, one of these priest-kings, Agokoli, launched a vast project to erect a sacred enclosure around Notsé, at least the second part of the walls of Notsé. This project caused significant conflict within the city-state's population, leading to division and the exodus of the Ewe from Notsé, an event the Ewe consider the origin of their people. The kingdom then declined until the German and French colonization of Togo.

During German colonization, a chieftaincy favorable to German interests was established. This chieftaincy played an important role in forming the national consciousness of the Ewe people, notably by claiming the heritage of the former kingdom of Notsé. It still organizes the religious and cultural festival of "Agbogbo-Za".
