= Dodoleglime festival =

Festivals in Ghana by the chiefs and the people of Ve

The Dodoleglime Festival is celebrated by the chiefs and peoples of the Ve Traditional Area in the Hohoe district of the Volta Region of Ghana. The festival is celebrated in November every year.

== The festival ==
Dodoleglime means "coming out of the wall" in the Ewe language. The festival is used to mark the migration of the people from Notsie in Togo in the 17th century to their present location in the south east of Ghana. The migration occurred because the people were fed up with the rule of Togbe Agorkoli. The people therefore use the festival to commemorate the heroics of their ancestors who devised a secret escape through a hole they dug in the wall that surrounded the Notsie town. Another reason for the celebration of the festival is for the people to honour certain ancestors who played leading roles in their secret escape.

== Other activities ==
Various other activities of mutual benefit to the Ve people and visitors during the celebrations are held. They include fund raising activities to raise monies for needed development projects in education and health. The Ve Educational Endowment Fund was established in 2001 to support brilliant but needy students in the area. Another activity that is organized is Public health issues awareness. During organized fora, various health issues including malaria and HIV are highlighted. Various sporting games such as soccer matches are also organized.

== Developmental projects ==
During the festival, the state of development projects is made known during the annual durbar. New projects are also initiated. During one of such durbars, it was announced that Ve-Lukusi Improvement Society had purchased a 15-acre lot in the area to construct a replica wall to mirror the one through which their ancestors escaped. The purpose of the project was to serve as a permanent reminder to all people of the struggle of their ancestors as well as serve as a tourist attraction.
