= AnimaxFYB Studios =

Animation Company

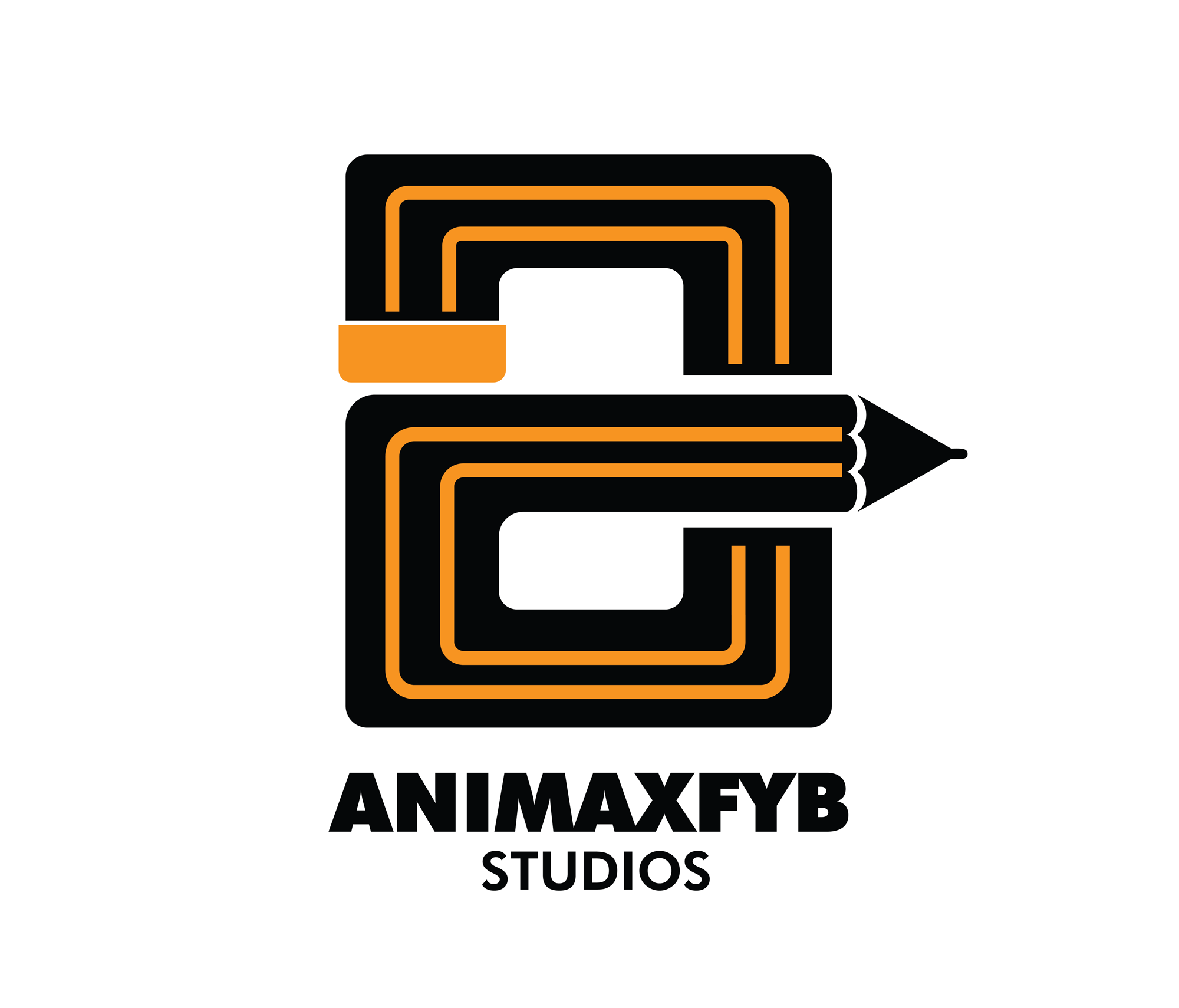
- Headquarters: Ghana

AnimaxFYB Studios is an animation multimedia company founded by Francis Yushua Brown. The company tells African stories in an animated format. They specialize in visual effects as well as 2D and 3D animation. They have produced award-winning animations. His studio is the first to have a project selected by Amazon Prime.

== History ==
AnimaxFYB Studios was founded in the year 2014 by Francis Y. Brown. The company won an award as Best Animation at the African International Film Festival in 2016, Official Selection of the FESPACO and Indie Film Festivals 2017, and Real Time International Film Festival for Best African Animation Film, 2017.

== Projects ==
Agorkoli, the cause of Hogbetsotso

=== Agorkoli ===
The story of Agorkoli focuses on the migration of the Ewe people who, in search of greener pastures, settled under Togbe Agorkoli, leader of the Notsies. They had a peaceful time for a period of time until an unknown rumor, which became a big conflict between the Notsies and Dogbos.

=== Osei Tutu ===
This is a 24-minute animated episode telling the story of how Osei Tutu fought for his people to be freed from the people of Denkyira. According to the creative director of the studio, Francis Y. Brown, this animation focused on two main characters, Osei Tutu and Okomfo Anokye.

== Achievements ==
- African International Film Festival (AFRIFF): Best Animation—2016
- Ghana UK-Based Achievement (GUBA) Awards, Animator of the Year - 2017.
- Ghana Movie Awards: Best Animation—2018.
- Nominated for the best short video at the Golden Movie Awards.
- Nominated for the Africa Movie Academy Award for the best animation in 2015.
- Best Animation at the Africa International Film Festival (AFRIFF)
- Best Animation at Zulu African Film Academy Awards (ZAFAA)
- Indie-wise film festival selection of Animaxfyb in 2017.
- FESPACO Film Festival Official Selection—2017.
- Real Time International Film Festival for Best African Animation Film - 2017.
- African International Film Festival Best Animation Nominee - 2018.
- Ghana Movie Awards Best Animation in 2018.
