= Godigbe Festival =

Festival in Ghana by the people of Aflao

The Aflao Godigbeza Festival is a festival held in Ghana among the people of Aflao. It is celebrated every year, in the month of October, to remember the triumphant mass departure of the people of Aflao from the cruel rule of King Agorkoli of Notsie. The festival preserves the people's history of migration from Notsie, in present-day Togo. The festival is celebrated by the gathering of the chiefs in a grand durbar with the people of Aflao.

The festival is associated with the worship of a deity and it attracts people from all over the country and across some West African countries.
