= Notsé Walls =

Sacred enclosure of Notsé, Togo

The walls of Notsé (Ewe: Notsé Gliwo; French: Murs de Notsé) or the Agbogbo and the Agbobovi are a sacred enclosure erected in Notsé, Togo, between the 16th and 17th centuries. The walls delineate two different areas, one called "Agbogbo" and the other called "Agbogbovi". Associated with the figure of Agokoli, the ruler of the city-state, they gained significant importance in West Africa, as the refusal to participate in their construction is said to have caused the exodus of the Ewe from Notsé, an event considered by the Ewe as the origin of their people. Although they were never completed, as the construction undertaken under Agokoli is said to have led to the ruin of the city, parts of the walls still remain at the beginning of the 21st century.

== History ==
=== Context ===
The ancestors of the Ewe were likely a people already present in the region of Togo and Ghana in the 13th century. However, it is difficult to trace their journey and evolution before their settlement in Notsé, where they founded a prosperous city and kingdom during the 15th century. According to surviving oral traditions, they were guided to the site of Notsé by the hunter Afotsè, also called Ndétsi, or under the leadership of an ancestor named Noin or Da. There, they merged with the populations already present in the area and founded the city. Although it was prosperous and housed the regional sanctuary of the god Mawu, political unrest quickly broke out among the city's ruling classes, weakening the priest-king. In the 17th century, one of these kings, Agokoli, took power after the death of his father, Ago. It appears that this king attempted to expand beyond the limited scope of his duties, purging his advisors and replacing them with his supporters.

=== Construction and exodus ===
In this context, Agokoli undertook the construction of the walls of Notsé, intended to be a sacred enclosure of monumental proportions for the time. The walls are called, or delineate, two different areas, known as "Agbogbovi" for the older one and "Agbogbo" for the more recent one. Despite the religious objections of several leaders, which reflected hostility to the project from part of the population, especially since the construction had to be carried out under difficult conditions due to the project's size, Agokoli persisted with his plans. The enclosure wall, discovered by archaeologists, is not a fortification wall but rather a religious and symbolic enclosure. In some traditional accounts, this wall is reinterpreted as having been made of "human blood and clay".

Agokoli is a very negative figure among the Ewe people, although this portrayal of him as an entirely negative and tyrannical king might be a later historical reconstruction. The erection of this wall triggered the exodus of the Ewe from Notsé, and the project was never completed. The walls extend over a little more than 14 kilometers and are two meters wide. Restoration work was undertaken in 2017 on the remaining portions of the structure.

== Legacy ==
An important ceremony of the Ewe people, called "Agbogbo-Za", takes place in Notsé. It reenacts the original exile of the people and their crossing of the sacred enclosure.
