= Klikor =

Coordinates: 6°05′N 1°02′E

- Interactive map of Klikor
- Country: Ghana
- Region: Volta Region

Klikor is a town in the Volta Region of Ghana. The town is known for the Klikor Secondary Technical School.

The main occupations of the people of Klikor are farming, (Kente) weaving, fishing, and salt mining.

The Klikors celebrate a festival called Zendo Glimetotoza. Zendo is a festival celebrated to mark the exodus of the people from the wicked King Agorkorli of Notsie in Togo.

There are four major shrines in Ketu South, and three of them are found in Klikor alone.

Klikor has two administrative structures namely the traditional leadership and the Zonal Council leadership. Torgbuigah Addo VIII is the paramount chief of Klikor Traditional Area. Hon Edward Gbeti is the Chairman of the Klikor Zonal Council.

Klikor has one of the best performing Health Centers in Ghana. The Klikor Health Center has over the years been the center for quality health provider in the Ketu South.

The traditional area boasts of two former IGPs of Ghana - John Kudalor and CK Dewornu

Local Representation

Klikor Zonal Council has 7 electoral areas under it. These include: 1. Klikor EA Hon. I. K Futsukpor 2. Dodorkope EA. Hon Edward Gbeti 3. Tackscorner EA Hon Nelson Miketo 4. Lotakor EA. Hon Moses Kordorwu 5. Tagbato EA. Hon David Kugbey 6. Kpoglu. Hon Michael Hodedzi 7. Afuta Glidzi. Hon Saviour Abotsi
