= Ayigbe biscuit =

Ghanaian snack

Ayigbe Biscuit
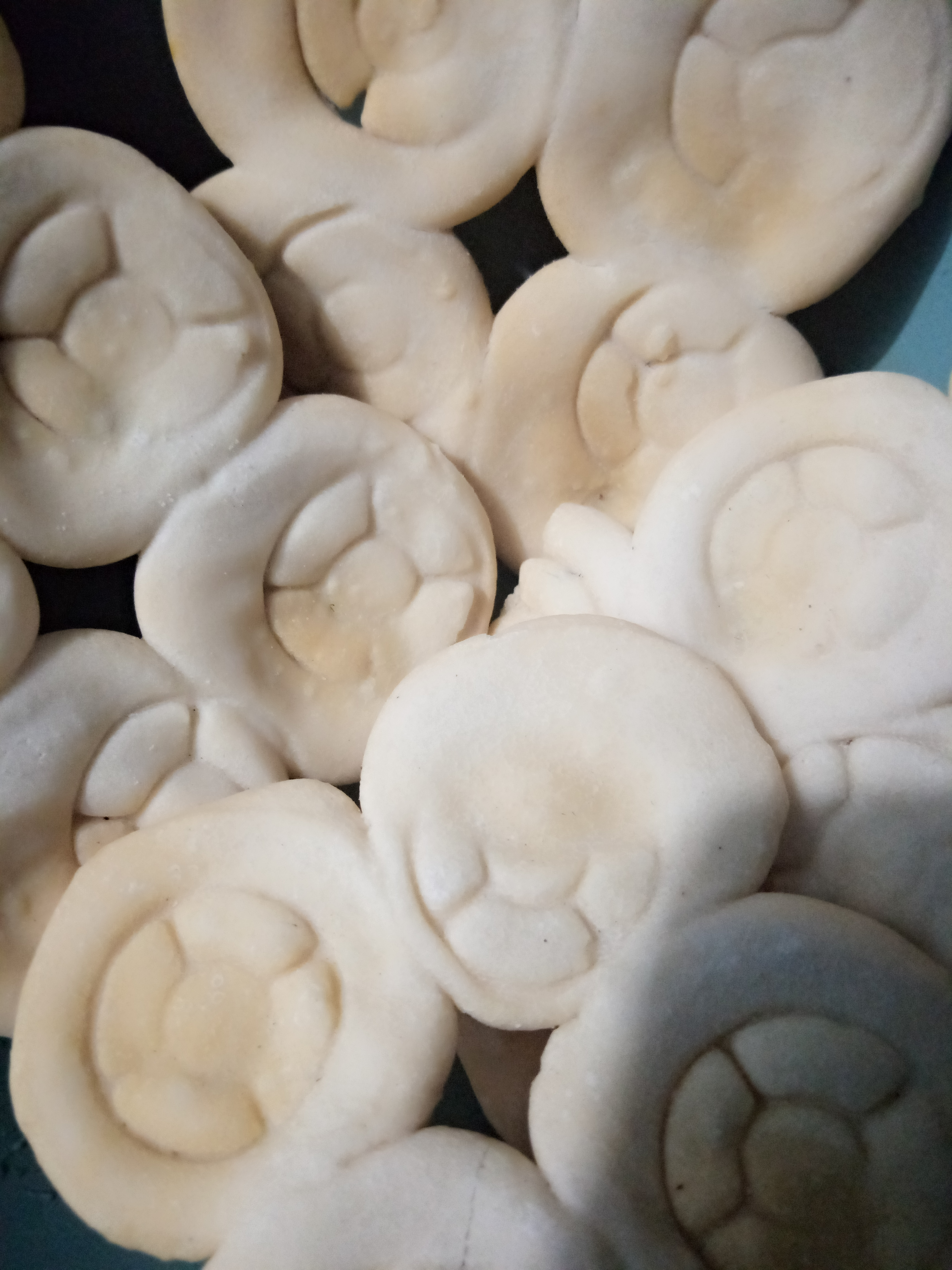
- Place of origin: Ghana
- Created by: Ewe people
- Serving temperature: Cold
- Main ingredients: Cassava starch, coconut, sugar, salt, and water

Ayigbe biscuit is a Ghanaian snack created by Yonunawo Kwami Edze from Agbozume in the Volta Region.

== History ==
The biscuit was manufactured by Yonunawo Kwami Edze from Agbozome in the Volta Region. Yonunawo Kwami Edze introduced the biscuit to the Agbozome community when she returned from the Ivory Coast as a baker in 1907. She was able to use the skills she learnt to make Ayigbe biscuits. Production of this snack lends itself to being economically viable, as Yonunawo Kwami Edze trained women on how to prepare the biscuit in order to make a living.
