= Francis Crowther =

Francis Crowther (died 22 July 1917) was a British colonial official in the British Gold Coast for nineteen years.

In 1912 Crowther chaired the Commission of Enquiry into the affairs of the Anlo State which confirmed a list of Anlo chiefs and established the extension of the Anlo state to include Avenor, Afife, Aflao, Dzodze, Fenyi, Klikor, Somye and Weta territories.

Crowther died of Yellow Fever while performing special duties in 1917.

== Publications ==
- (1904) Short History and Description of the Gold Coast Colony, Ashanti, and the Northern Territories London: Waterlow & Sons
- (1906) 'Notes on a district of the Gold Coast' Quarterly Journal of the Institute of Commercial Research in the Tropics 3: 168–182.
- (1911) Gold Coast Handbook London (with W. S. D. Tudhope)
- (1912) Gold Coast: Report for 1911 London: HMSO
- (1916) Notes for the guidance of district commissioners, Gold Coast Colony Accra: Government Press
