= Marthe Eféwélé Kwami =

Ghanaian writer

Marthe Eféwélé Kwami was a Ghanaian writer born in Accra, Gold Coast in 1896. Her autobiography was one of the first texts written by an African woman. It was written in the Ewe language but first published in German in 1938 in Afrikaner erzhählen ihr Leben (Africans tell their life) by Diedrich Westermann, a collection of eleven self-portrayals of African natives.
