= Olympio =

Olympio can refer to any of the following:

- Chico Olympio (d. 1886), Brazilian trader
- Octaviano Olympio (d. 1940), Brazilian trader and Togolese activist and politician and brother of Chico
- Sylvanus Olympio (1902 – 13 January 1963), first Togolese prime minister and president and nephew of Chico and Octaviano
- Gilchrist Olympio, Togolese opposition leader and son of Sylvanus
- Olympio, a horse that won the American Derby, Hollywood Derby and San Vicente Stakes in 1991
