= The Tragedy of Agbezuge =

1949 novel by Sam J. Obianim

The Tragedy of Agbezuge (Ewe: Amegbetɔa alo Agbezuge ƒe Ŋutinya) is a novel by Sam J. Obianim published in 1949. It takes place in a place in Eweland which comprises parts of Ghana, Togo, and Benin. It is set during the pre-colonial period where there were series of wars among different groups. The plot of the story is in two parts.

== Plot ==
The first part of the story introduced readers to the wealth of Hotor Desu, and his slaves. He later married Domelevo. At the marriage ceremony Agbezuge wept when he heard a particular song. Agbezuge narrated his life story to Hotor Desu and included how he escaped from the evil village. Domelovo wanted to seduce Agbezuge but before the story could go out she was killed by Agorbaya because the wages of sin is death. Hotor Desu truly love Domelovo. Agorbaya advised Agbezuge that so many friends lead to death. This part ended with the death of Hotor Desu and how his property was shared because he had no children to inherit him.

The second part is about the sufferings of Agbezuge, they include how Agbezuge was wounded by his friends who attempted to kill him. The disappearance of Bumekpo led Agbezuge to be banished from the town. Papa Ge the old man recounts the story of the wars between the Asantes and the Ewe to his children. When Agbezuge arrived he accepted him and when Agbezuge was sick he and the wife treated him. During the great drought Agbezuge worked hard so that there is food for all the people. Another tragedy struck when he was accused of stealing money belonging to Papa Get. He was beaten and chained. It the end Agbezuge found his lost family. His only son was returned to him.

== Literary significance ==
Agbezuge is written in Ewe language. This language is spoken in southeastern Ghana, southern Togo and southern Benin.

Students use the text as an Ewe literature book in the West African Examination Council examinations.

== Publication information ==
Agbezuge was first published in 1949 by E. P. Church Press of Ho, Ghana. A French translation was published in 1990, and is listed among UNESCO collection of representative works.

== Read also ==
- Hlobiabia - (The Vengeance). Ayeke K 1973. Accra Bureau of Ghana languages 97 pages.
- Kofi Nyameko Nutinya - (The story of Kofi Nyameko) by Frank Kofi Nyaku, 1955. Ho Ghana. E. P Church Book Depot. 81 pages
- Ku le Xome - (Death in the Room) by Seth Akafia. 1970. Accra. Bureau of Ghana Languages 179 pages.
- Amedzro Etolia (The Third Visitor) Frank Kofi Nyaku. 1988. Bureau of Ghana Languages
