= Sacred enclosure =

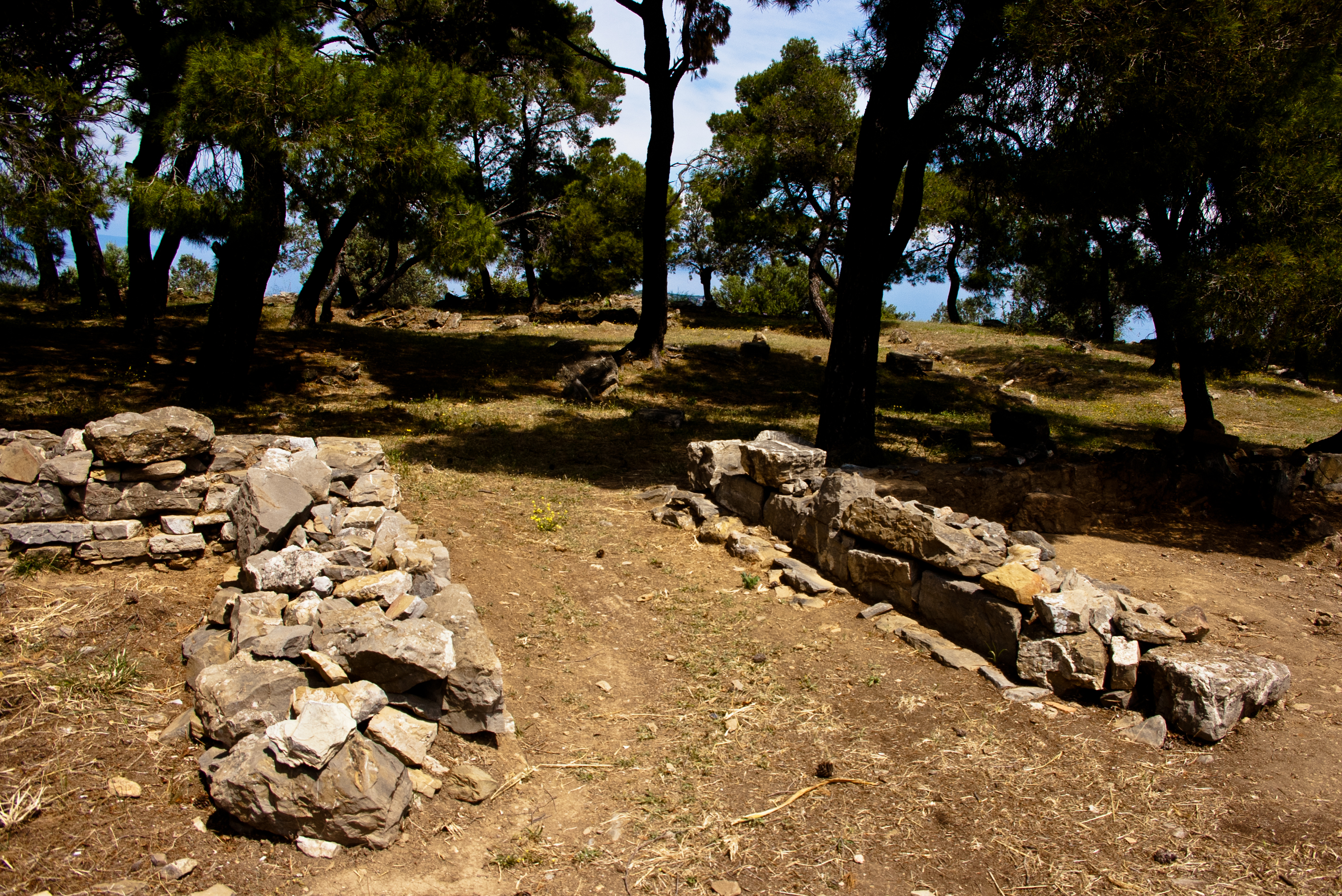
Entrance and peribolos of the Temple of Poseidon, island of Kalaureia.

In the study of the history of religions and anthropology, a sacred enclosure refers to any structure intended to separate two spaces: a sacred space and a profane space. Generally, it is a separation wall erected to mark the difference between the two spaces, acquiring significant symbolic meaning. Many human cultures have made use of sacred enclosures, found in Mesopotamia, as well as in pre-Columbian America, sub-Saharan Africa, such as in Notsé, or in Mediterranean cultures, such as Greece and Rome. The use of sacred enclosures is also a crucial aspect of the Abrahamic religions, as seen in the construction of the Temple of Jerusalem or pilgrimages such as the Hajj. In some cases, this separation is placed within a single sacred space, dividing it, as with enclosures separating people according to their gender in certain churches, mosques, and synagogues.

The term refers to the structure that establishes, reinforces, or accentuates separations, but it is sometimes used more broadly to describe all sacred boundaries imposed on spaces, although the term "sacred boundary" is more accurate in this case. Anthropologically, it is an important aspect of human culture, as it often establishes the limits of the profane space by erecting a visible marker signifying the presence of the sacred space. It is central to the notion of the sacred.

== Anthropology ==
=== Clarifying aspect ===
The erection of a sacred enclosure, whether a large compound or a simple wall, is central to a clarifying aspect. By establishing and making visible the boundaries between places, the enclosure defines both the sacred and the profane. It also generally reinforces cultic behaviors; faced with the material impossibility of crossing this space, humans must align their actions with the cult, which is thus materialized and made present to the entire community.

=== Delimiting aspect ===
The sacred enclosure marks an extraction from the profane world. After crossing the boundaries, the individual finds themselves in a different perception of time, where the normal course of events no longer seems to follow its usual rhythm. In this place and after passing through the enclosure, communication with the supernatural is perceived as more natural and evident.

== History ==
=== Antiquity ===
The erection of a sacred enclosure is often associated with the foundation of a city. For example, when the Phoenician city of Byblos was refounded in the mid-4th millennium BCE, the sacred enclosure demarcating the future temple of the city was the first structure of the city. Byblos was not unique; older Mesopotamian cities like Eridu and Uruk also centered around sacred enclosures that defined the boundaries of their temples. These two Mesopotamian cities have the most significant Mesopotamian sacred enclosures, but nearly all cities of the ancient Near East featured such enclosures, including those in Cyprus. While many myths directly link supernatural intervention to the selection and delimitation of the sacred space, in some cases, divine intervention was said to construct the enclosure, as seen in Uruk, where the god An was directly involved in its construction.

In Minoan Crete and the wider ancient Aegean region, such structures are also attested. The Celts were frequent builders of sacred enclosures, often using them in their rituals. Prehistoric stone circles in France might be of a similar nature. Similar phenomena are attested in North America from the 5th century BCE. The Greeks also used sacred enclosures, which were central to their practices. They used them to delimit the space of temples or sacred groves, such as the sanctuary at Delphi. It is possible, though not certain, that the second part of the goddess Artemis’s name comes from the Greek root for sacred enclosure, “τέμενος” (temenos). The Persians were also known for this practice, as seen in Pasargadae. According to Strabo, the cults of ancient Georgia incorporated such enclosures.

Among the Romans, the pomerium referred to the sacred boundary of the city. This boundary was sometimes marked by a sacred enclosure, which also had military and defensive roles, as seen with the Servian Wall. In this case, according to Plutarch, the gates were not part of the sacred enclosure, allowing passage through them.

Parallel or similar dynamics are observed in ancient Judaism. For example, it was forbidden for a foreigner to enter the enclosure of the Temple of Jerusalem, as noted by the Temple Warning inscription. In the case of the Temple of Jerusalem, it was constructed in a concentric structure, where each crossed enclosure brought one closer to the Holy of Holies, perceived as the physical dwelling of the God of Israel. Thus, it was a place segmented by numerous sacred enclosures, which were omnipresent markers of the sanctity of each stage where one found themselves.

=== Middle Ages ===
In Europe and Asia, this structure was adopted in Christian places of worship, with churches separating themselves from the outside through the erection of walls that enclosed a sanctuary, separated from the rest by a wall or veil, the precursor to the iconostasis or rood screen. In some cases, Christians and Jews implemented other built markers within their places of worship, such as establishing a separate gynaeceum for female congregants. Similar internal separations are also found in mosques, with a different space, sometimes even a separate room, allocated for the prayers of men and women.

In sub-Saharan Africa, such practices are found among the ancestors of the Ewe people, as evidenced by the stories related to the exodus of the Ewe from Notsé, where the ancestors decided to leave the city after the tyrannical king Agokoli chose to erect a vast sacred enclosure. The Incas in Central America also seemed to make use of sacred enclosures.
