= Ferdinand Kwasi Fiawoo =

Ferdinand Kwasi Fiawoo (26 December 1891, in Wasuta – 21 July 1969) was a Ghanaian religious minister, playwright and educator, founder of Zion College, the first secondary school in Ghana's Volta Region.

== Life ==
Ferdinand Kwasi Fiawoo was the son of John Kpeglo Fiawoo, a self-made businessman who belonged to the royal family of the Awadada Stool of the Anlo state, and his wife Maria Dzatugbui Dadzehoe Agbodzi. Initially discouraged from joining the ministry, he entered commerce with a brother. After visiting Freetown in 1920, he began improving his education with correspondence courses. In 1928 he travelled to the United States and studied at Johnson C. Smith University in Charlotte, North Carolina. In five years he gained a Bachelor of Arts degree, a Bachelor of Divinity degree, a Master of Theology degree and a certificate in education. While a student, he also wrote his first Ewe drama, Toko Atolia in 1932, which won a prize from the International Institute of African Languages and Culture in London. In 1933 he was ordained an AME Zion Church minister at Gloversville, New York.

Returning to the Gold Coast in November 1933, Fiawoo was appointed a Superintendent of the AME Zion Church in East Gold Coast, and General Manager of the Zion Education Unit at Keta. After co-founding the Gold Coast People's College at Adidome, he set about founding a new private secondary school in Anloga, the first secondary school in the Volta Region. The New Africa University College opened with 44 students in 1938. Fiawoo, his staff and students toured his plays to raise funds for the school: Toko Atolia toured in 1940, and Tuinese in 1946, with an English version in 1947. Funding was also secured from the AME Zion Church in 1948, and some government subsidies from 1952.

In 1945 Fiawoo gained a PhD from Roosevelt University in Chicago. He entered politics in 1951, as a member of the Legislative Assembly of the Gold Coast representing the Council of Chiefs for the Anlo state. His house was burnt down in an Anloga riot against taxes in January 1953, and Fiawoo did not return to politics after losing his Assembly seat in the 1954 elections. In 1952 he resigned as headmaster of New Africa University College. The college changed its name to Zion College and relocated to Keta; Fiawoo remained chairman of the college's Board of Governors from 1954 until his death in 1969. He was simultaneously, from 1953, Chairman of Keta secondary school Board of Governors. In 1966 he co-founded the Bishop Small Theological College, named after John Bryan Small, at Whuti.

Fiawoo married five times: in succession, Frederica Nukamowor Atagba (1917), Grace Kuwor Duse-Anthony (1919), Charity Zormelo (1942, a teacher at the college, who died in October 1945), Flora Fiwor Gedza (1951) and Faustina Adzoyo Manyo, née Amedume (1963).

== Plays ==
- Toko Atolia(which translates in English as "The fifth landing stage"), Accra: Achimota Press, 1942. (Ewe)
  - German translation by D. Westermann & R. Schober, Berlin, 1937
  - English translation by the author as The Fifth Landing Stage, London: United Society for Christian Literature, 1943
- Tuniese, unpublished MSS., 1945. (One-act play of eight scenes, destroyed in the 1953 Anloga riots.)
  - Newly written version of Tuniese, 1958. (Three acts and seven scenes, in both Ewe and English)
- Fiayidziehe, 1962 (Ewe; later translated into English)
