= List of rulers of the Ewe state of Anlo =

The Ewe State of Anlo is headed by the Dutor. the traditional political and spiritual leader of the Anlos. The first Dutor, Torgbiga Wenya I was the founder of the Anlo Kingdom and instituted the clan system. He did this purposely for identification through the patrilineal system.

== List of rulers of the Ewe State of Anlo ==
Tenure (Note: All dates up to 1997 follow those of the list of Awoamefias compiled by Agbotadua Kumassah, official historian of the Awoamefia Palace.)	Awormefia (ruler)	Clan	Notes
1468–1504	Togbi Sri I	Adzovia	Was known as Kponoe before installation as chief by his maternal uncle Togbi Amega Wenya at Notsie. Along with Wenya, led the migration of Ewes from Notsie to the southern Volta area that became Anlo State.
1504–1524	Togbi Adeladza I	Bate
1525–1538	Togbi Zanyedo I	Adzovia
1540–1568	Togbi Akotsui I	Bate
1568–1594	Togbi Nditsi I	Adzovia
1595–1630	Togbi Adzanu I (Fiayidziehe)	Bate
1631–1660	Togbi Agodomatu I	Bate
1661–1685	Togbi Agoleha I	Adzovia
1686–1725	Togbi Axolu Nunya I	Bate
1726–1776	Togbi Atsia I	Adzovia
1784–1810	Togbi Atsiasa I	Adzovia
1810–1840	Togbi Letsa Gbagba I	Bate
1849–1906	Togbi Amedor Kpegla I	Bate
1906–1956	Togbi Sri II	Adzovia
1957–1997	Togbi Adeladza II	Bate
1997–2011	Awadada Togbi Agbesi Awusu II (Acting Awormefia)	Agave
2011–present	Togbi Sri III	Adzovia	Installed February 23, 2011.

== See also ==
- Ewe people
- Ghana
- Gold Coast
- Lists of incumbents
