= Avenor =

Avenor can refer to:

- Avenor Ewe, a sub-tribe of the Ewe people of Ghana
- Canadian International Paper Company, at one time called Avenor Inc.
- Avener, an officer of the stables under the Master of the Horse
