= Victoria Zormelo-Gorleku =

Ghanaian prison officer and priest

Victoria Ama Zormelo-Gorleku
- Born: Victoria; 14 September 1907
- Other name: Antima
- Citizenship: Ghana
- Occupation: Missionary
- Known for: Prison officer
- Father: Godfred Nyavor Zormelo

Rev. Mrs. Victoria Ama Zormelo-Gorleku (born 14 September 1907) was the first woman prison officer in Ghana, and the first ordained woman priest in any of the established Mission Churches in Ghana.

== Life and career ==
Victoria Ama Zormelo (affectionately called "Antima"), an Ewe, was the second daughter of Godfred Nyavor Zormelo, a former North German Mission employee and a fishing business proprietor from Tegbi, in the Volta Region and Emilia Tornyewonya Ablawo Tamakloe, a bread and cake seller. Charity Zormelo was her older half-sister.

She started her elementary education at the local African Methodist Episcopal Zion School. After completing, she gained employment with the District Commissioner in 1927 and was the only woman to pass the Civil Service Entrance Examination in May 1927. Victoria Ama Zormelo was posted to the Department of Posts and Telegraphs at Accra. She gave up her job upon marriage to a Mr Godfred Gorleku of Ada Foah, but was left widowed and pregnant within a year. Having lost her husband when five months pregnant, she had no choice but to return to her family at Keta in the Volta Region, where she gave birth to her first child Alberta Olivia Gorleku.

Victoria returned to work with the Department of Posts and Telegraphs at Koforidua in 1932. She later resigned again to marry George Kojo Deh of Leklebi Duga a clerk in the District Commissioner's Court, Koforidua, in a customary Ewe ceremony later that year, and had two more children: Love-Grace Amedome Deh on 31 October 1933 and George Kojoga Deh on 3 June 1935. She never did take her new husband's name.

In 1941, her second husband, George Kojo Deh died and again, she was forced to return to her family at Keta. A widow for the second time and single mother to three small children, Victoria Ama Zormelo desperately needed to get back to work, so later that year, she joined the Gold Coast Prisons Service at Ho in the Volta Region, as a temporary matron at the female prison and subsequently obtained a transfer to Keta Prisons. Rising quickly through the ranks, she was transferred to the James Fort maximum security prison in Accra, where she continued to excel, becoming the first female Prisons Superintendent (Director of the Ghana Prisons Service), in November 1963.

Upon her retirement from the now Ghana Prisons Service in 1967, Victoria Zormelo-Gorleku trained for the Christian ministry and on 21 April 1970 she was ordained Deaconess by Bishop W. H. Hilliard, becoming the first woman priest of the AME Zion Church in Ghana.
