= Togbi Sri II =

Ghanaian politician (1862–1956)

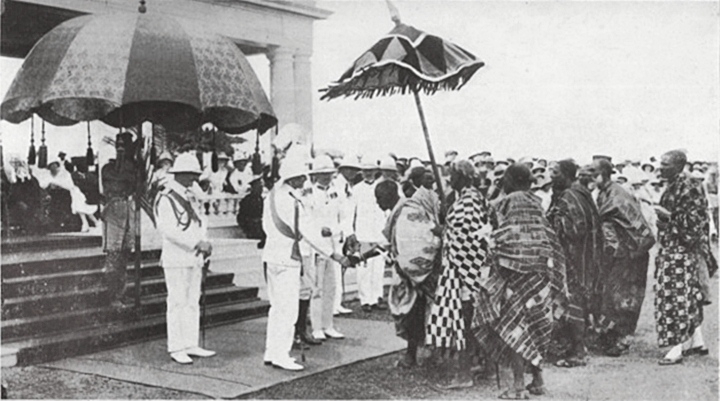
Sri II, Awoamefia of Anlo, being presented to Prince of Wales, Accra 1925

Togbi Sri II CBE (1862–1956) was the Awoamefia (ruler) of the Anlo people of South East Ghana from 1906 to 1956.

== Early life and education ==
Born Cornelius Kofi Kwawukume in 1862, he attended the Bremen Mission schools in Keta before working as a clerk in Sierra Leone and the German Cameroons. While in Kamerun, he became head of the Ewe speaking community there.

== Chieftaincy role ==
Upon becoming Awoamefia, Sri II modernised the role, developing it into a constitutional monarchy. He abandoned the traditional practice of the Awoamefia living in seclusion, and removed the ban on the wearing of European clothing in the traditional capital Anloga. He became friends with Francis Crowther, the District Commissioner at Keta, which helped him expand the influence of the Anlo Traditional State In 1912 Crowther, then Secretary for Native Affairs in the Gold Coast included Avenor, Afife, Aflao, Dzodze, Fenyi, Klikor, Some and Weta in the Anlo State.

In 1914, he supported British forces against the Germans in Togo, for which he was awarded the CBE. He also held a seat on the Legislative Council of the Gold Coast (1916-1921 and 1926-1942).

He is popularly known for his wise sayings on training children and ensuring the good of the state.
