= Octaviano Olympio =

Afro-Brazilian trader in Lomé, Togo (died 1940)

Octaviano Olympio (died 1940) was an Afro-Brazilian trader who helped expand Lomé, the future capital of Togoland and Togo. Son of Francisco Olympio Sylvio, Octaviano Olympio studied as a young man in Nigeria and London before working with his brothers Chico and Cesar at a branch office of the British trading firm A. and F. Swanzy. In 1882, Octaviano and Chico were commissioned to open a new branch office in the growing trading center of Bey Beach on the Gulf of Guinea. The office was immediately successful, allowing the founding of the Olympio family in what would soon become the city of Lomé.

Following Chico's 1886 death, Octaviano continued to expand the office with help from older sisters Clara and Julia; he also bought property on Market Street, the city's key trading district, and in 1889 founded Lomé's first coconut plantation. By 1892, Octaviano Olympio was one of the most powerful citizens of the town, and instrumental in opening Lomé's first Catholic mission school. In 1903 he expanded successfully into cattle-raising.

Olympio would also be prominent in Togo's anti-colonial movement. Records show that in 1891, Olympio was ordered flogged by Acting Commissioner Markus Graf von Pfeil over a dispute involving a horse; Olympio would be fined in both 1898 and 1899 for disobedience to the German authority. On 24 May 1909, he joined Ewe pastor Andreas Aku in petitioning the colonial government for greater rights, and signed a second petition in 1913.

With the end of World War I, France took possession of Togo. Though Olympio greeted the new government with initial skepticism, he warmed to the French over time, learning the French language, traveling to Paris in 1924, and accepting several medals from the French government, including the prestigious Chevalier de la Légion d'honneur.

Olympio died in 1940, leaving 24 children. One of his sons, Pedro, would go on to be the first Togolese doctor trained in Europe, while Octaviano's youngest son, Luciano, would go on to be the Attorney General of Togo's Supreme Court. His nephew Sylvanus (son of brother Epiphanio), would become both the first Prime Minister and the first President of independent Togo.
