= Charity Zormelo =

Ghanaian teacher (1904–1945)

Charity Akoshiwo Tornyewonya Zormelo, subsequently Mrs Fiawoo (1904 – 14 October 1945) was the first woman graduate from the Gold Coast, and the first woman from English-speaking West Africa to earn a B. S. degree.

== Life ==
Charity Zormelo, an Ewe born in Keta, Ghana, was the daughter of Godfred Nyavor Zormelo, a former North German Mission employee and fishing business proprietor, and Patience Abolitsi Dzokotoe. Victoria Zormelo-Gorleku was her younger half-sister. Completing elementary school education at the local African Methodist Episcopal Zion School in 1919, Zormelo taught for a while before being sponsored by the local minister to travel to the United States in 1926 for further study. In 1930 she graduated from high school in Bordentown, New Jersey, and used a $300 scholarship to enroll in Home Economics at Hampton Institute. Active in student societies, she graduated in 1934. Though she was recommended to Achimota College, there were no teaching vacancies there and on returning to the Gold Coast she began teaching at Mmofraturo, a recently founded Wesleyan girls boarding-school at Kumasi. A public lecture on education, delivered in Accra in 1935, was welcomed by the African Morning Post.

World War II disrupted Charity Zormelo's efforts to pursue study in the United States for a Masters in Education. She moved to teach at New African University College in Anloga, and in 1942 married the college's founder and President, Ferdinand Kwasi Fiawoo. With her husband, other staff and students she toured southern Eweland - in both the Gold Coast and Togoland - with his play Toko Atolia. Intending to return to the United States to continue study after the war, she died aged 41 on 14 October 1945.
