= Ve people =

Ewe subgroup living in the Hohoe district in Volta Region, Ghana

The Ve people live in the Hohoe district of the Volta region of Ghana. They celebrate the Dodoleglime festival.
