= Diamond Cement Ghana Limited =

Cement producing company in Ghana

Coordinates: 06°07′30″N 01°11′06″E

Diamond Cement Ghana Limited is an Indian-owned Portland cement producing company located at Aflao in the Volta Region of Ghana near the border with Togo. The plant complements the Government Industrialization Program and economic up-lift. The company is using the latest technology of Programmable Logic Control (PLC) system in the cement production process to maintain consistency in the quality.

== History ==
It started production in 2002 with annual production of 700,000 tonnes of cement and was inaugurated by former President John Kufuor of Ghana in 2004.

The company in February 2014, completed a 2.5 km rail siding connecting it to the Togo Railway network, giving access to the port of Lomé, Togo, for easy delivering of clinker for cement production.

== See also ==
- Ghana Cement
- Cement in Africa
- Railway stations in Ghana
- Railway stations in Togo
