= Togbui Amenya Fiti V =

Togbui Adzongaga Amenya Fiti V is the paramount chief of the Aflao Traditional Area in the Volta Region of Ghana.
