= Aflao =

Town in Volta Region, Ghana

- Border town
- View of Aflao and the Ghana–Togo border

- Location in Volta Region
- Coordinates: 06°08′48.4″N 01°10′47.6″E
- Country: Ghana
- Region: Volta Region
- District: Ketu South District

Government
  - Municipal chief: Hon. Maxwell Koffie Lugudor

Population (2012)
  - Total: 66,546
  - Ethnicities: Ewe; Akan; Ga-Adangbe
  - Religions: Christianity; Islam; traditional African religions
- Ranked 28th in Ghana
- Time zone: GMT
  - Summer (DST): GMT
- Postal district: VZ
- Area code: +233 (3625)
- Climate: Aw
- Website: ketusouth.gov.gh

Aflao is a border town in the Ketu South District in the Volta Region of Ghana on the border with Togo. It is the twenty-eighth most populous settlement in Ghana, with a population of 66,546 people (according to a 2012 estimate).

== History ==
During the Atlantic slave trade, the town grew from interference from the Anlo, towards the west, and Little Popo (Aného) towards the east, located in present-day Togo. During this time, it change hands from the Danish to the British in 1850 due to slavery ending. In 1879, The British added Aflao into the Gold Coast after initially not being included. During the late twentieth century, the border became a site of reincurring tensions. At the peak of the 1982-83 revolution, the town was under constant surveillance as border guards and cadres attempted to enforce a curfew. During this time, from 1986 to 1987, Togolese officers installed a fence along the border's southern stretch after attacks from Ghanaian insurgents.

== Economy ==
Customs office in Aflao (1962)

The Diamond Cement Ghana Limited factory is located at Aflao. In early 2014, a 2.5 km rail siding was completed to connect the cement works to the port of Lomé. This siding crosses the border from Togo to Ghana and is of the 1,000 mm (3 ft 3 3/8 in) gauge. The total average annually volume of trade that goes through the border crossing, from data in 1996, is 24,876,651 kilograms (54,843,628 lb).

== Demographics ==
Historical population
Year	Pop.	±%
1984	20,904	—
2000	38,927	+86.2%
2010*	56,988	+46.4%
2012*	66,546	+16.8%
*Estimate; Source: Ghana Statistical Service. (Note: Sources: 2000 census, 2010 and 2012 estimates)

As of a 2012 estimate, Aflao has a population of 66,546 people. Most of the population is religious, with the largest religion being Christianity. Other popular religions include Islam and traditional African religions. Historically, Aflao people believed in one universal goddess named Mawu, which is believed to be all powerful and everywhere. The majority of the population is Ewe, followed by the Akan and Ga-Adangbe people.

== Administration ==
The town's municipality has a mayor–council form of government. The mayor (executive chief) is appointed by the president of Ghana and approved by the town council, the Ketu South Municipal Assembly. As of 2024, the current mayor of the municipal is Hon. Maxwell Koffie Lugudor.

== Geography ==
Aflao is located on the eastern coast of Ghana and is a major border town neighboring Togo.

=== Municipality area ===
The town is also located in the Ketu South Municipal District, which has a total land area of 779 square kilometres (301 sq mi). The municipality bordered Togo to the east, Keta Municipal District towards the west, the Ketu North District to the north and the Gulf of Guinea towards the south.

=== Climate ===
Aflao has a tropical savanna climate (Köppen climate classification Aw), experiencing a wet season and a dry season annually whilst the dry season occurs from December to February. The wet usually lasts from April to July or from September to October. The mean annual rainfall ranges from 850 to 1,000 mm (2.79 to 3.28 ft) while the mean monthly temperatures are usually from 24 to 30 °C (75 to 86 °F).

== Culture ==
Aflao is located in the Aflao traditional area (Note: In Ghana, the term 'traditional area' is used to describe an area in which all of its community members shared the same culture, and are under the same Omanhene (Paramount Chief)) has Togbui Amenya Fiti V as its paramount chief. He is the traditional ruler of the land and performs traditional administrative and ceremonial functions in the area.

== Transport ==
At the border crossing, the most popular mode of transportation is pushcarts, followed by trucks/cargo trucks.

== Healthcare ==
Aflao is home to a port health unit, a facility under the Port Health Directorate (division of the Ghana Health Service) which helps to combat public health emergencies at Ghana's land border crossings.

== Notable people ==
- Dzifa Gomashie (born 1965), former Deputy Minister of Tourism
- Joseph Kossivi Ahiator (born 1956), artist
- Komla Dumor (1972-2014), journalist

== See also ==
- Godigbe festival
- Railway stations in Togo
- Railway stations in Ghana
