= Ghana Cement =

Cement producing company in Ghana

Coordinates: 05°38′14.3″N 0°00′27.8″E

Ghana Cement (Ghacem)
- Type: Private
- Industry: Cement
- Founded: 1967
- Headquarters: Tema, Ghana
- Website: https://www.ghacem.com/en

Ghana Cement (also known as Ghacem) is the largest producer of cement in Ghana. It was founded by the Government of Ghana in collaboration with Norcem AS of Norway, on 30 August 1967. Ghacem has since inception produced more than 30 million tons of cement.

== Operations ==
The two primary factories of Ghacem are situated in Takoradi and Tema. The bigger of the two factories, Tema, was the first to be founded. The Takoradi plant was established in the 1990s to cater to Ghana's Central and Western regions.

== See also ==
- Diamond Cement Ghana Limited
