= Eda (king) =

Semi-legendary founder of the Kingdom of Notsé

Sacred king of Notsé Mawufia
Names
- Da; Noin
Era dates
- 15th century
- People: Ewe

Eda, also known as Da or Noin depending on the various recorded oral traditions, is considered the ancestor of the Ewe people and the founder of the Kingdom of Notsé. Upon arriving in the region with a group, Eda is said to have received the land of Notsé after negotiating with a priest of Mawu who owned the land. He then became the sacred-king of the city and established his dynasty there. The elements concerning his life blend with myth, and he is regarded as the ancestor of the Ewe people.

== Biography ==
=== Onomastics and divergent sources ===
Depending on the versions of the preserved oral traditions, he is named Eda, Da, or Noin. In some versions, he is not the founder of the Kingdom of Notsé, but rather, it was founded by a hunter named Afotsè or Ndétsi.

=== Common narrative ===
In the common version of the traditions regarding him, Eda is said to have moved to the Notsé region with a group of people. He and his ancestors are believed to have come from a region called Ayo, which might correspond to Oyo, in modern-day Nigeria. From Ayo, this group is thought to have moved, notably through the Kingdom of Tado, to the current site of the city of Notsé. Eda would then have come into contact with a priest bearing the title "Mawuno", or "priest of Mawu", who supposedly owned the lands and gave them to him. Eda then took the title "Mawufia", or "king of Mawu", which likely indicates the evolution of the monarchy in question.

Eda is also credited as the author of the royal palace complex in Notsé. Additionally, a serpent god named Eda is attested in the city.
