= Chico Olympio =

Afro-Brazilian trader in West Africa

Chico Olympio (1854–1886), also known as Francisco Olympio Junior, was an Afro-Brazilian trader active on the Gulf of Guinea coast in the late nineteenth century. A son of Francisco Olympio Sylvio, he worked with his brothers Octaviano and Cesar Olympio for the British trading firm A. and F. Swanzy.

In 1882, Chico and Octaviano Olympio were commissioned to open a branch office at Bey Beach, a growing trading centre that later became Lomé, the capital of Togoland and modern Togo. The success of this commercial establishment contributed to the emergence of the Olympio family as one of the most influential Afro-Brazilian families in the city.

== Biography ==
=== Family background ===
Chico Olympio was one of the sons of Francisco Olympio Sylvio, an Afro-Brazilian trader born in Salvador, Bahia, in Brazil, who settled on the West African coast in the nineteenth century. The Olympio family belonged to the wider Afro-Brazilian community of West Africa, made up of families connected to commercial, cultural and religious exchanges between Brazil and the Gulf of Guinea coast.

His brothers included Octaviano Olympio, Cesar Olympio and Epiphanio Elpidio Olympio. Through this family network, the Olympios became involved in trade between coastal towns such as Agoué, Aného and Lomé, as well as with European trading firms active in the region.

=== Commercial activity in Lomé ===
In the early 1880s, Chico Olympio worked with his brothers Octaviano and Cesar in a branch of the British trading firm A. and F. Swanzy. At that time, Bey Beach was becoming an important commercial site on the Gulf of Guinea coast. Its position allowed traders to link maritime commerce with inland exchange networks.

In 1882, Chico and Octaviano were sent to Bey Beach to open a new branch office for A. and F. Swanzy. The office was successful, and the brothers' activity helped strengthen the commercial role of the settlement.

The establishment of the Olympio family at Bey Beach was an important stage in the development of Lomé. After the German protectorate over Togo was proclaimed in 1884, the town gradually became a major administrative and commercial centre of German Togoland.

== Death ==
Chico Olympio died in 1886. After his death, his brother Octaviano continued to develop the family's commercial interests in Lomé and became one of the leading figures in the town's economic and political life.

== Legacy ==
Although less documented than his brother Octaviano, Chico Olympio played an early role in the establishment of the Olympio family in Lomé. The family's influence later extended into commerce, education, the professions and politics. One of its best-known descendants, Sylvanus Olympio, became the first president of independent Togo in 1960.

== See also ==
- Francisco Olympio Sylvio
- Octaviano Olympio
- Olympio family
- Lomé
- Togoland
- Afro-Brazilians
