= Anlo Ewe =

Subgroup of the Ewe people of Togo, Ghana and Benin

Regions with significant populations
- Ghana

Languages
- Ewe, English, French

Religion
- Predominantly Vodun and some number of Christian.

Related ethnic groups
- Anlo Ewe is a sub-group of the Ewe people, Avenor Ewe.

The Anlo Ewe are a sub-group of the Ewe people of approximately 6 million people, inhabiting southern Togo, southern Benin, southwest Nigeria, and south-eastern parts of the Volta Region of Ghana; meanwhile, a majority of Ewe are located in the entire southern half of Togo and southwest Benin. They are a patrilineal society governed by a hierarchal, centralized authority. Their language (self-name Anlogbe) is a dialect of the Ewe language, itself part of the Gbe language cluster. The Ewe religion is centered on the Supreme God, Mawu and several intermediate divinities. Christianity has been accepted in every part of Anlo Ewe land, with a minority of people still practicing traditional Vodun beliefs.

== Etymology ==
The name Ŋlɔ (nlo) (of Aŋlɔ or Anlo) is said to derive from the Ewe term ŋlɔ or 'nlo' which means rolling up or folding into oneself. It could also be interpreted as shrunken or shriveled skin. Torgbui Atsu Wenya, the founder of Anlo state was reputed to have uttered the words “me nlo “ in Ewe in his reluctance to migrate further when prompted by his kinsmen to do so. Wenya had separated from the other groups at nearby Wheta for the seashore.

== History ==
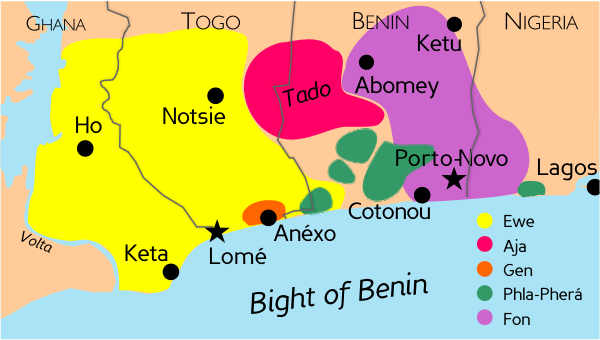
The Anlo Ewe people settled in the westernmost end of the region.

It is thought they migrated to their present home from Notsie, Togo sometime in the later part of the seventeenth century.The move is said to be more of an escape than migration from a regime change in the city. Upon first arrival in Notsie, the current king, Adela Atogble, received them well, but after his death the successor, Togbe Agorkoli, ruled oppressively upon the Ghana Ewes. He ordered all elders to be killed. The King Agorkoli treated the people very badly. The city of Notsie was circumscribed by a large sacred wall which became a barrier to the Ewe devising escape. Upon consultation of the hidden elder, Tegli, the Ewe came up with an extravagant plan of escape. The people planned for the escape very well. For days the women of the group would moisten the wall in one place during their daily clothes washing activities. When the wall was weak enough, the plan then culminated in the gathering of all the Ewe, Tegli drawing the “Sword of Liberation” summoning the gods, and piercing the wall proclaiming, “O Mawuga Kitikata, ʋuʋɔ na mi ne miadogo, azɔ adzo” (Oh great God Kitikata, open the door for us so that we walk through). When they were escaping they walked backwards and separated, so that their King, King Agorkoli, would not trace or find them.

Most groups settled in villages in coastal regions of Togo, Benin, with some settling in south-eastern parts of the Volta Region of Ghana, many of which are associated with the slave trade that affected the Ewe populations. The Avenor Ewe settled to the north of the Anlo and are now to be found in Akatsi South District and Akatsi North District. A northern migration was the result of frequent slave raids and spread the Ewe people throughout southern Togo, southern Benin to south-western Nigeria. The shallow waters and many islands of Bight of Benin provided a safe-haven to all but the most aggressive slave traders.

== Political system ==
The current political system stems from the necessity of military organization to deal with the conflicts in the 17th and 18th centuries. Upon arrival in the French Togoland, the Ewe people split into smaller subtribes or chiefdoms. Each was autonomous but acknowledged that they are all a single people. The Anlo is one of these tribes.

The Anlo adopted the military organisational methods of the Akwamu, including their wing system. The Anlo people were divided by geographical location to create three wings. The Lashibi, coming from the west, defended the left flank, the Adotri the center, and the Woe from the east, defended the right flank. All were under the rule of a loosely governing ‘central' authority, the king called Awoamefia.

Historically, the power of the central authority is rarely invoked; only in times of war or in need of serious judicial counseling. The king is chosen from one of two royal clans either the Adzovia or Bate; selection does not follow the traditional monarchal rule of primogeniture. The clans rotate the designation of kings, keeping one single clan from maintaining power. The selection is made by the elders of the clan from several candidates presented by the various sections of the clan. The elected king holds a position of divinity living in seclusion, only dealing with the three senior chiefs in charge of the geographical regions.

These three chiefs as well as the sub-chiefs and head-men in their respective areas have jurisdiction in investigation of crimes and to settle local disputes. The involved parties do have the right to appeal to the king after a ruling has been made in a lower court. The Awoamefia is assisted by two councils in the appeals decisions and general matters. One is composed of the elders of each clan; the other consists of the three military chiefs. Historically the council of elders is more influential based on the Anlo belief that the power of the king is vested in the people. “Du menɔa fia me o. Fiae nɔa du me” (The people do not live with the King. It is the King who lives with the people). If the King ruled out of favor of the people they had the right to replace him.

== Kinship system ==
=== The clan ===
The Anlo-Ewe are a patrilineal people. Members each belong to a clan in which they believe to have descended along the male line. In most of the larger settlements, all clans are represented, sometimes by more than one lineage. Lineages are defined as a branch of the clan in which the male and female members can trace relationships back to a common male ancestor. The lineage, in contrast to the clan, is exogamous. Each lineage has its own symbols, ancestral shrine, common property and a lineage head. The head is usually the oldest surviving member of the lineage. He has the final say in most all decisions and disputes and regulates all dealings with lineage interests including land dispersal. On top of secular activities, the lineage head is also the chief priest. He leads many of the ceremonies and serves as the link between the living and dead as all religious offerings are presented to him.

The smallest unit within a lineage is a hut; this is either a wife and her unmarried children or the same with the husband as well. There is a practice of polygyny although a small percentage of men actually have more than one wife. The man is the head of the household or afe and can act without interference except from his father. There is a large respect for elders and as long as a father is around the son is expected to comply with any of his demands.

==== List of clans ====
- Laƒe
- Amlade
- Adzovia
- Bate
- Likei
- Bame
- Klevi
- Tovi
- Tsiame
- Agave
- Amɛ
- Dzevi
- Ʋiƒeme
- Ɣetsoƒe
- Blu

=== Kinship terminology ===
Child (both sexes)	Vi
Sibling (both sexes)	Nɔvi
Female sibling	Da / Nɔvinyornu
Male sibling	Efo / Nɔviŋutsu
Mother	Enɔ or Dada
Father	Etɔ or Fofo
Mother's elder sister	Daga or Nɔga
Mother's younger sister	Daɖia or Nɔdi
Mother's brother	Nyrui
Father's sister	Etɛ or Tasi
Father's elder brother	Tɔga
Father's younger brother	Tɔdia
Grandfather	Tɔgbe or Tɔgbui
Grandmother	Mama
Great Grandfather	Tɔgbuiga
Great Grandmother	Mamaga

== Religion ==
Traditionally, the Anlo-Ewe have one Supreme God Mawuga Kitikata or just Mawu. Mawu is synonymous with the Christian Almighty God and is believed to be all powerful and everywhere at once. There are no shrines or devotional ceremonies because of this omnipresent belief and instead the people practice religion through lower level divinities. These include Yewe, Afa, Eda, Nana, and Mami Wata. The first two are the most popular, each having a membership initiation process to worship.

Yewe is the god of thunder and lightning. When members are initiated under Yewe, a Yewe name is given at a graduation ceremony. The person's old name now becomes taboo and if used, the speaker can be put in front of a council of priests to be sentenced to pay a large fine.

Afa is the astral god of divination, also the younger brother of Yewe. Members do not get new names and keep their birth names. Performances are at the forefront of devotional activities for Afa. Members and non-members celebrate Afa together; however, the non-member must wear white clothing and can not dance next to a member unless at a funeral. If these rituals are not followed properly, non-members are fined.

=== Funerals ===
As elderly respect is in high regard in the Ewe society, funerals traditionally are extravagant events incorporating a multitude of events over a month's span:

- Amedigbe: The body, previously preserved with herbs, is buried on this day usually two to three days after death.
- Ndinamegbe: The day after burial principal mourners are received.
  1. Nudogbe: Day for wake-keeping 4–6 days after burial.
- Yofogbe: The day after wake-keeping lineage rituals are performed. Family members of the deceased receive gifts and donations for funeral expenses.
- Akontawogbe: Three days later donations are counted.
- Xomefewogbe: Several days after Akontawogbe a final cost of the funeral is calculated. If donations exceed costs, donations may be returned; if costs exceed donations additional sums may be raised.

Funeral donations are a main focus of ceremonies due to the high cost of an Anlo funeral. Costs include the coffin, burial clothes, public dances, food, alcohol, and provision of accommodations for distant guests.

In a more modernized and mobile society funeral ceremonies now usually take place over a single weekend, sometimes several weeks after death to allow for distant relatives to travel and allow for accommodation of employment or work.

Anlo-Ewe funerals are the most likely to involve colorful performances of dance and drumming groups. Lively and spectacular performances if the deceased was an honorable and involved member of the community. Sometimes distant family members may commission performances months after death if they could not be present at the actual funeral.

== See also ==
- Gbe languages
- Ewe language
- Ewe music
- Rulers of the Ewe state of Anlo
- Hogbetsotso festival

== Notes ==
1. Anlo is known for a peculiarity of its tonal system. Like neighbouring Ewe varieties, Anlo has three tone levels, High (H), Mid (M), and Low (L). Of these three levels, the lower two are not phonemically contrastive. However, Anlo contrasts with the other dialect in the possession of a fourth tone level, the extra-High tone (R). The R tone is viewed as an innovation of Anlo, since the most economic way of generalising about the R tone is to apply 'R tone rules' to the common tonal forms to derive the Anlo tonal forms. Clements (1977) argues that the R tone is a case of tonal split caused by 'reanalysis of downstepped tone sequences as sequences of tones on distinct tone levels' (p 168).
