= John Bryan Small =

American bishop (1845–1905)

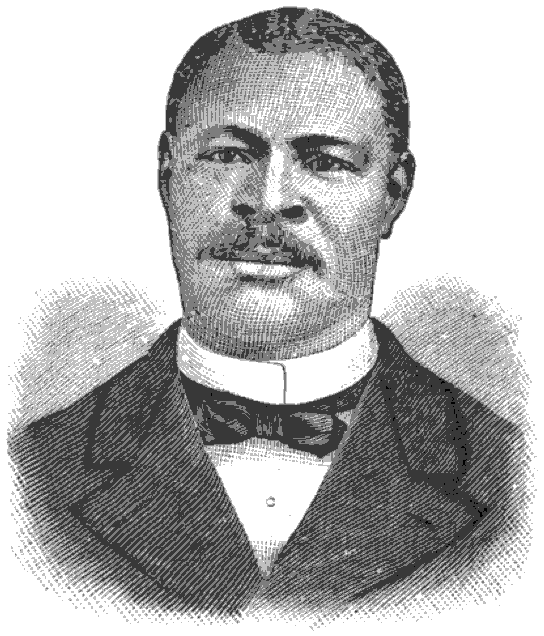
- Born: March 14, 1845; Saint Joseph, Barbados
- Died: January 15, 1905 (aged 59); York, Pennsylvania, United States
- Education: Codrington College
- Occupation: Clergyman
- Spouse: Mary J. Blair (m. 1873)

John Bryan Small (March 14, 1845 – January 15, 1905) was a Barbadian-American bishop in the AME Zion Church.

== Biography ==
John Bryan Small was born in Saint Joseph, Barbados on March 14, 1845. He was educated at St. John Lodge, and graduated from Codrington College with A.B., S.T.B., and A.M. degrees. He joined the British Army as a clerk and was stationed in the Gold Coast for three years, resigning due to British aggression towards the Asante.

In 1871 he travelled to the United States, becoming a preacher with the AME Zion Church. He married Mary J. Blair on October 23, 1873.

In 1896 he was elected AME Zion bishop to Africa, where he concentrated his work in the Gold Coast, training indigenous African church leaders including James E. K. Aggrey by sending them to Livingstone College.

Small returned to the US in 1904. He died at the Episcopal residence in York, Pennsylvania on January 15, 1905. His deathbed words were "Don't let my African work fail."

== Publications ==
- Practical and Exegetical Pulpiteer
- The Human Heart Illustrated
- Code on Discipline of the A.M.E. Zion Church
- Predestination, Its Scriptural Import
