= Enoch Aboh =

Beninese linguist and academic

- Born: Enoch Oladé Aboh
- Known for: Comparative syntax; Creole linguistics; Multilingualism and language contact

Academic background
- Education: University of Geneva

Enoch Oladé Aboh is a Beninese linguist whose research focuses on theoretical and comparative syntax, creole linguistics, multilingualism, and language acquisition in multilingual ecologies. He is Professor of the Learnability of Human Languages at the University of Amsterdam and Director of the Amsterdam Centre for Language and Communication (ACLC).

== Education ==
Aboh earned a Licence ès Lettres in linguistics and English literature from the Université du Bénin (now the University of Lomé) in Togo. He also obtained a master's degree in comparative syntax and a master's degree in general linguistics at the University of Geneva, where he completed his doctorate in linguistics in 1998.

== Academic career ==
Aboh taught English linguistics and comparative syntax, drawing on empirical data from West African languages, at the University of Geneva, where he served as Assistant and later as Chargé de cours. In 2000, he joined the University of Amsterdam, where he participated in a research project investigating the contributions of enslaved Africans to the emergence of Surinamese creoles in seventeenth-century colonial Suriname.

In 2003, Aboh was awarded a five-year Vidi grant for his project The Typology of Focus and Topic: A New Approach to the Discourse–Syntax Interface. He became Assistant Professor in 2008 and was appointed Professor of the Learnability of Human Languages in 2012.

Aboh has held visiting academic appointments, including Visiting Associate Professor at MIT (Spring 2008) and Presidential Visiting Professor at Yale University (Spring 2019). He has taught at several LSA Summer Institutes (MIT 2005; University of Chicago 2015; UMass 2023) and LOT Winter/Summer Schools (2005, 2010). He is co-founder of the African Linguistics School (ALS), which he has co-organised and co-taught since 2009.

Since 2019, he has served as Director of the Amsterdam Centre for Language and Communication (ACLC).

== Research ==
Aboh’s research focuses on grammatical structure, language contact, and multilingualism. His work integrates comparative syntax, creole linguistics, sign languages, and multilingual language acquisition to explore how languages evolve, interact, and are learned in multilingual settings.

He is known for advancing the view that contact languages, including creoles, offer insights into the human capacity for language. In his book The Emergence of Hybrid Grammars: Contact, Change and Creation (2015), he argues that multilingual speakers combine features from multiple languages to create new grammatical systems—“hybrid grammars”—illustrating that similar cognitive processes shape both creole and non-creole languages.

His work also addresses the syntax–discourse interface, particularly information-structure phenomena such as focus and topic marking, drawing on comparative analyses of Gbe languages (a subgroup of Kwa languages), creoles, European languages, Sinitic languages, and sign languages.

Aboh has co-led several projects funded by the Dutch Research Council (NWO), including:

- Crossing language borders: A quest for the human language capacity in West Africa and Central America (2023–2028; co-PIs: Maria Carmen, Parafita Couto, Felix Ameka, Annie Beatty)
- Argument structure in three sign languages: Typological and theoretical aspects (2014–2018; co-PI: Roland Pfau)
- Functional categories in analytic languages (2008–2012; co-PIs: Umberto Ansaldo, R. P. E. Sybesma, and Lisa L.-S. Cheng)

== Honors ==
- Fellow, Netherlands Institute for Advanced Study (NIAS) (2011–2012)
- Honorary Member, Linguistic Society of America (2023)
- International Honorary Member, American Academy of Arts and Sciences (2026)

== Selected bibliography ==
- Aboh, E. O. (2004). The Morphosyntax of Complement–Head Sequences: Clause Structure and Word Order Patterns in Kwa. Oxford University Press.
- Aboh, E. O. (2004). "Topic and Focus within D." Linguistics in the Netherlands, 21: 1–12.
- Aboh, E. O. (2005). "Deriving Relative and Factive Constructions in Kwa." In: Brugè et al. (eds.), Contributions to the 30th Incontro di Grammatica Generativa, 265–285.
- Aboh, E. O. (2009). "Clause Structure and Verb Series." Linguistic Inquiry, 40: 1–33.
- Aboh, E. O. (2010). "Information Structuring Begins with the Numeration." IBERIA, 2(1): 12–42.
- Aboh, E. O.; Essegbey, J. (2010). Topics in Kwa Syntax. Springer. ISBN 978-90-481-3189-1.
- Aboh, E. O.; Smith, N.; Zribi-Hertz, A. (eds.) (2012). The Grammar of Reiteration in Creole and Non-Creole Languages. Benjamins.
- Aboh, E. O.; Guasti, M. T.; Roberts, I. (eds.) (2014). Locality. Oxford University Press.
- Aboh, E. O.; Schaeffer, J.; Sleeman, P. (eds.) (2015). Selected Papers from Going Romance Amsterdam 2013. Benjamins.
- Aboh, E. O. (2015). The Emergence of Hybrid Grammars: Contact, Change and Creation. Cambridge University Press.
- Aboh, E. O. (ed.) (2017). Complexity and Simplicity in Human Languages: A Multifaceted Approach. Language Sciences, 60.
- Aboh, E. O.; Haeberli, E.; Puskás, G.; Schönenberger, M. (eds.) (2017). Elements of Comparative Syntax: Theory and Description. Mouton.
- Kimmelman, V.; Pfau, R.; Aboh, E. O. (eds.) (2019). Argument Structure across Modalities. Open Linguistics.
- Aboh, E. O. (2019). "Pourquoi parlons-nous tous un créole ?" Faits de Langues, 49(1).
- Aboh, E. O. (2020). "Lessons From Neuro-(a)-Typical Brains: Universal Multilingualism, Code-Mixing, Recombination, and Executive Functions." Frontiers in Psychology, 11:488.
- Aboh, E. O.; Vigouroux, C. (eds.) (2021). Variation Roll the Dice: A Worldwide Collage in Honour of Salikoko Mufwene. Benjamins.
- Essegbey, J.; Aboh, E. O. (eds.) (2024). Predication in African Languages. Benjamins.
