= Avenor Ewe =

Ethnic groups in Ghana

Regions with significant populations
- Ghana

Languages
- Ewe, French, English

Religion
- Predominantly Vodun and Christianity, Islam

Related ethnic groups
- Agave Ewe, Anlo Ewe, other Ewe subgroups

The Avenor Ewe are a sub-tribe of the Ewe people of Ghana. The origin of the name Avenor is not known. Avenor could be loosely translated as forest dwellers.

== Location ==
Their traditional area is located in the south eastern part of the Volta Region of Ghana. The Avenor has Avenorpeme as their traditional seat and Akatsi as the administrative capital. Administratively, the people of Avenor can be found in two districts namely the Akatsi South District which is Avenorland and Akatsi North District which the Avenors share with their neighbours to the north, the Aves. The traditional area is bordered to the south by the Anlo Ewe (Keta Municipal District) on the east by the Somes (Ketu District), the west by the Tongus and Agaves (North and South Tongus districts) and North by the Aves (Akatsi North district).

== History ==
Tradition has it that the Avenor people lived in a town by the name Avenor Ketukpe, a suburb of Ketu in the lower Niger area, the original home of all Ewe-speaking people. The Avenor like other Ewe groups moved from Avenor Ketukpe to Notsie due to incessant conflicts with their enemies (mostly like the Yorubas) The headman or leader of the Avenors at Ketukpe was Togbe Agbohlo whose son Anumah led the Avenors to Notsie.

On leaving Notsie, the Avenors under their leader Anumah, moved very closely with the Agus, with whom they found their first settlement at Avenor-Agu Volui near present Kpalime in the Republic of Togo. Their next settlement was at Anyirawase Awudome. Tribal frictions made them move to Fodzoku from where they later crossed the Volta to Kroboland, founding a settlement at Kpong. They became known as Avenor Krobos. This is still sung in songs and the Avenors still have descendants in Kroboland. Frequent clashes with the Akwamus made the Avenors to leave to continue their wandering. From Kroboland there was a general dispersion. One group defected to found a settlement by the Gas at a place now called Avenor close to the Police Training Depot in Accra. The larger group led by Togbui Anumah made settlement at Tefle Avenorkpo in Fieve land. Avenorkpo still stands.

The group that sojourned in Accra had to flee from Accra to look for the larger group at a time when Ofori, the King of Accra and his people also fled from the Akwamus to LittlePopo (about 1682). Quarrel over farmland and fishing zones with the Tefles made the Avenors to cross the Volta to found a settlement at Yorta, later called Detsowome, near Dabala. At Yorta, a male child without one arm and an eye was born to one Ku of the chiefly (royal) family. The incident was an ill omen. Then there arose the saying "Detsagbawor" a typical Avenor word meaning, what strange thing has befallen us. Detsagbawor is now Detsawame. By then the Accra group had caught up with the group led by Anumah. Trekking resumed and the Avenors found a new home at Adume near present Avenorpedo (Avenor's deserted home). Here, Togbui Anumah went to farm to be succeeded by his son Atsu Fiadzea. Anumah's grave has been marked by an uncultivated grove, now still standing at Adume-Avenorpedo.

The Tefles had not forgiven the Avenor encounters they had at Teflekpo and took to kidnapping Avenor women when the opportunity occurred. At Adume the nearest source of water was at Lotor, a distance of four miles away. Whenever Avenor women went to fetch water the Tefles would lay ambush to them and either kill or kidnap them, so the place become known as Lotor-Latsi meaning "you will come but not return". This situation forced the Avenors under their leader Atsu Fiadzea to move away to a place called Korvenu (the grove that protects).

At Korvenu the Avenors in alliance with the Adas fought the Anlo in 1750 and 1767. In 1775, the Avenors again fought the Anlos in what is called the Korvenu War or Anyamakpa war. The scene of war is called Ametawito meaning the "pit of skull". The Avenors had to abandon their settlement to found a new home at Agbiveme also Afeyeme (new abode). Here Atsu Fiadzea died and was succeeded by his son Adoe under whom the Avenors made their permanent home at Avenorpeme about 1776. From the settlement at Avenorpeme, new settlements were founded by hunters and adventurers emanating from the thirteen clans of Avenor.

== Paramount Chiefs ==
- Torgbui Anumah
- Torgbui Atsu Fiadzea
- Torgbui Adoe
- Torgbui Kwaku Blihla ( Regent)
- Torgbui Dzoboku (Regent)
- Torgbui Kumasa (Regent)
- Torgbui Todjo (Regent)
- Torgbui Letsa
- Torgbui Ete
- Torgbui Doe Dorglo Anumah
- Torgbui Avorga III
- Torgbui Dorglo Anumah IV
- Torgbui Dorglo Anumah V
- Torgubui Dorglo Anumah VI (current)

== Clans ==
Avenor has thirteen (13) clans namely;

- Fiato
- Wugbeme
- Awasiapedome
- Agbevie
- Atsiame
- Deme
- Kpogedi Found Them In Xavi
- Atsite
- Lume
- Serviawo
- Gbodome
- Agornu
- Adrovie
