= Togbe Agorkoli =

Mythical ruler of the Ewe people

Togbe Agorkoli (Eʋegbe: Togbe Agɔ Akɔli) was a dictator and draconian ruler of Notsie, a town in modern Togo. During his rule, the Ewe people in what is now known as Ghana and Togo escaped from Notsie to their present lands.
