= Ewe language =

Language of Ghana, Togo, and Benin

Ewe
- Eʋegbe
- Pronunciation: [ɛβɛɡ͡bɛ]
- Native to: Ghana, Togo, Benin
- Region: Southern Ghana east of the Volta River
- Ethnicity: Ewe
- Native speakers: 5.0 million (2013–2019)
- Language family: Niger–Congo?: Atlantic-Congo; Volta–Congo; Volta-Niger; Gbe; Ewe
- Writing system: Latin (Ewe alphabet); Ewe Braille

Official status
- Official language in: Togo

Language codes
- ISO 639-1: ee
- ISO 639-2: ewe
- ISO 639-3: Variously: ewe – Ewe wci – Waci kef – Kpesi
- Glottolog: ewee1241 Ewe kpes1238 Kpessi waci1239 Waci Gbe
- ELP: Kpessi
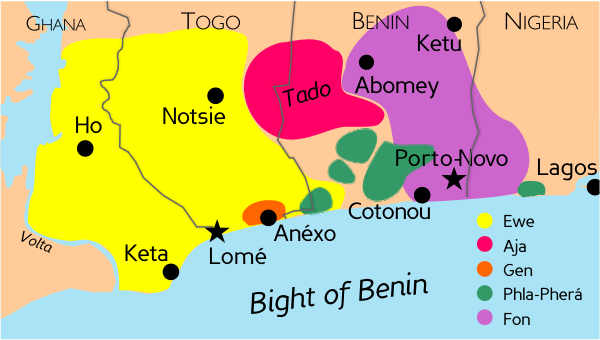
- Gbe languages. Ewe is in yellow.

- Person: Eʋe
- People: Eʋeawó
- Language: Eʋegbě
- Country: Eʋenyígbá

Ewe (endonym: Eʋe or Eʋegbe [ɛβɛɡ͡bɛ]) is a language spoken by approximately 5 million people in West Africa, mainly in Ghana and Togo. Ewe is part of a group of related languages commonly called the Gbe languages. The other major Gbe language is Fon, which is mainly spoken in Benin. Like many African languages, Ewe is tonal as well as a possible member of the Niger-Congo family.

The German Africanist Diedrich Hermann Westermann published many dictionaries and grammars of Ewe and several other Gbe languages. Other linguists who have worked on Ewe and closely related languages include Gilbert Ansre (tone, syntax), Herbert Stahlke (morphology, tone), Nick Clements (tone, syntax), Roberto Pazzi (anthropology, lexicography), Felix K. Ameka (semantics, cognitive linguistics), Alan Stewart Duthie (semantics, phonetics), Hounkpati B. Capo (phonology, phonetics), Enoch Aboh (syntax), and Chris Collins (syntax).

== Dialects ==
Some of the commonly named Ewe ('Vhe') dialects are Aŋlɔ, Tɔŋu (Tɔŋgu), Avenor, Agave people, Evedome, Awlan, Gbín, Pekí, Kpándo, Vhlin, Hó, Avɛ́no, Vo, Kpelen, Vɛ́, Danyi, Agu, Fodome, Wancé, Wací, Adángbe (Capo).

Ethnologue 16 considers Waci and Kpesi (Kpessi) to be distinct enough to be considered separate languages. They form a dialect continuum with Ewe and Gen (Mina), which share a mutual intelligibility level of 85%; the Ewe varieties Gbin, Ho, Kpelen, Kpesi, and Vhlin might be considered a third cluster of Western Gbe dialects between Ewe and Gen, but Kpesi is as close or closer to the Waci and Vo dialects, which remain in Ewe in that scenario. Waci intervenes geographically between Ewe proper and Gen; Kpesi forms a Gbe island in the Kabye area.

Ewe is itself a dialect cluster of the Gbe languages, which include Gen, Aja, Kotafon, Mina and Xwla and are spoken from the southern part of Ghana to Togo, Benin and Western Nigeria. All Gbe languages share at least some intelligibility with one another. Some coastal and southern dialects of Ewe include Aŋlɔ, Tongu (Tɔŋu), Avenor, Dzodze, and Watsyi. Some inland dialects indigenously characterized as Ewedomegbe include: Ho, Kpedze, Hohoe, Peki, Kpando, Aveme, Liati, Fódome, Danyi, and Kpele. Though there are many classifications, distinct variations exist between towns that are just miles away from one another.

== Phonology ==
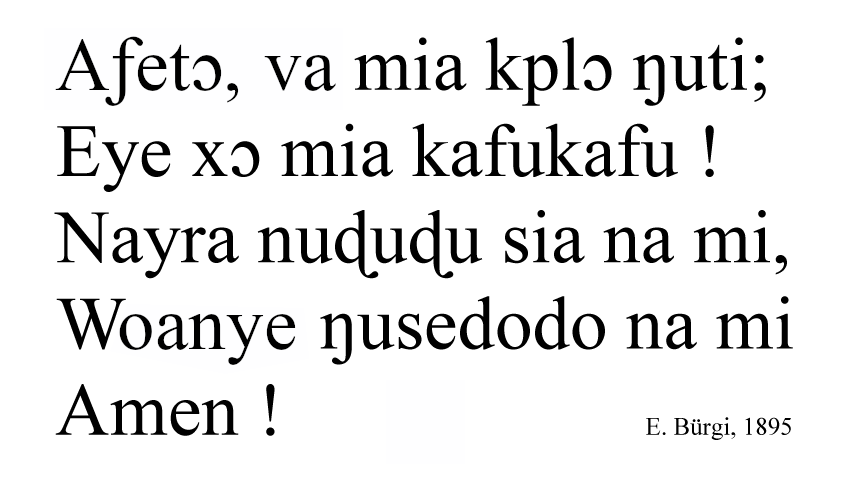
Grace in Ewe (translation)

=== Consonants ===
		Bilabial	Labio-dental	Dental	(Post-) Alveolar	Palatal	Velar	Labial–velar	Glottal
Plosive	voiceless	p		t̪			k	k͡p	
Plosive	voiced	m ~ b		d̪	n ~ ɖ		ŋ ~ ɡ	ɡ͡b	
Affricate	voiceless			t͡s					
Affricate	voiced			d͡z					
Fricative	voiceless	ɸ	f	s			x		
Fricative	voiced	β	v	z			ɣ ~ ɰ ~ w		ʁ ~ ʕ ~ ɦ
Approximant					l ~ l̃	ɲ ~ j	ɣ ~ ɰ ~ w		
Trill					r				
Tap					(ɾ ~ ɾ̃)				

H is a voiced fricative, which has also been described as uvular, [ʁ], pharyngeal, [ʕ], or glottal [ɦ].

/n/ is typically alveolar as [n̺], but can also be dental as [n̪].

The nasal consonants [m, n, ɲ, ŋ] are not distinctive since they appear before only nasal vowels; therefore, Ewe is sometimes said to have no nasal consonants. However, it is more economical to argue that nasal /m, n, ɲ, ŋ/ are the underlying form and so are denasalized before oral vowels. This phenomenon is known as nasal harmony.

[ɣ] occurs before unrounded (non-back) vowels and [w] before rounded (back) vowels.

Palatalization of alveolar consonants /t͡s, d͡z, s, z/ before a high-front vowel /i/ occur in the Southern dialect, and are heard as [t͡ʃ, d͡ʒ, ʃ, ʒ].

Ewe is one of the few languages known to contrast [f] vs. [ɸ] and [v] vs. [β]. The f and v are stronger than in most languages, [f͈] and [v͈], with the upper lip noticeably raised, and thus more distinctive from the rather weak [ɸ] and [β].

/l/ may occur in consonant clusters. It becomes [ɾ] (or [ɾ̃]) after coronals.

=== Vowels ===
	Front	Central	Back
Close	i, ĩ		u, ũ
Close-mid	e, ẽ	ə, ə̃	o, õ
Open-mid	ɛ, ɛ̃	ə, ə̃	ɔ, ɔ̃
Open		a, ã	

The tilde (˜) marks nasal vowels, though the Peki dialect lacks /õ/. Many varieties of Ewe lack one or another of the front mid vowels, and some varieties in Ghana have the additional vowels /ə/ and /ə̃/.

Ewe does not have a nasal–oral contrast in consonants. It does, however, have a syllabic nasal, which varies as [m n ŋ], depending on the following consonant, and carries tone. Some authors treat it as a vowel, with the odd result that Ewe would have more nasal than oral vowels, and one of these vowels has no set place of articulation. If it is taken to be a consonant, there is the odd result of a single nasal consonant that cannot appear before vowels. If nasal consonants are taken to underlie [b ɖ ɡ], however, there is no such odd restriction, and the only difference from other consonants is that only nasal stops may be syllabic, a common pattern cross-linguistically.

=== Tones ===
Ewe is a tonal language. In a tonal language, pitch differences are used to distinguish one word from another. For example, in Ewe the following three words differ only by tone:

- to ‘ear’ (High tone)
- to ‘report/gossip’(High tone)
- to ‘pound’ (High tone)
- tó 'mountain' (High tone)
- tǒ 'mortar' (Rising tone)
- tò 'buffalo' (Low tone)

Phonetically, there are three tone registers, High, Mid, and Low, and three rising and falling contour tones. However, most Ewe dialects have only two distinctive registers, High and Mid. These are depressed in nouns after voiced obstruents: High becomes Mid (or Rising), and Mid becomes Low. Mid is also realized as Low at the end of a phrase or utterance, as in the example 'buffalo' above.

In writing, tones are marked by acute accent, grave accent, caron, and circumflex. They may be used along with the tilde that marks nasal vowels.

=== Pragmatics ===
Ewe has phrases of overt politeness, such as meɖekuku (meaning "please") and akpe (meaning "thank you").

== Orthography ==
The African Reference Alphabet is used when Ewe is represented orthographically, so the written version is somewhat like a combination of the Latin alphabet and the International Phonetic Alphabet.

A a	B b	D d	Ɖ ɖ	Dz dz	E e	Ɛ ɛ	F f	Ƒ ƒ	G g	Gb gb	Ɣ ɣ
/a/	/b/	/d/	/ɖ/	/d͡z/	/e/, /ə/	/ɛ/	/f/	/ɸ/	/ɡ/	/ɡ͡b/	/ɣ/
H h	I i	K k	Kp kp	L l	M m	N n	Ny ny	Ŋ ŋ	O o	Ɔ ɔ	P p
/h/	/i/	/k/	/k͡p/	/l/	/m/	/n/	/ɲ/	/ŋ/	/o/	/ɔ/	/p/
R r	S s	T t	Ts ts	U u	V v	Ʋ ʋ	W w	X x	Y y	Z z	
/r/	/s/	/t/	/t͡s/	/u/	/v/	/β/	/w/	/x/	/j/	/z/	

An "n" is placed after vowels to mark nasalization. Tone is generally unmarked, except in some common cases, which require disambiguation: the first person plural pronoun mí 'we' is marked high to distinguish it from the second person plural mi 'you', and the second person singular pronoun wò 'you' is marked low to distinguish it from the third person plural pronoun wó 'they/them'

- ekpɔ wò [ɛ́k͡pɔ wò] — 'he saw you'
- ekpɔ wo [ɛ́k͡pɔ wó] — 'he saw them'

== Naming system ==
The Ewe use a system of giving a first name to a child based on the day of the week the child was born. This arises from the belief that a child's real name can be determined only after the child has shown its character. However, since a child is a person, not an object, the child must be referred to by some name in the interim, and so a name is provided based on the day of birth. A final name is given at a naming ceremony, seven days after the date of birth.

As a matter of pride in their heritage, especially since the 1970s, many educated Ewe, who were given Western names, have dropped those names formally/legally or informally and use their birthday name as their official name.

The Ewe birthday-naming system is as follows:

Day	Male Name	Female Name
Dzoɖagbe (Monday)	Kɔdzo, Kwadzo (Kojo)	Adzo, Adzowɔ
Braɖagbe, Blaɖagbe (Tuesday)	Kɔmla, Kɔbla, Kwabla	Abra, Abla, Brã
Kuɖagbe (Wednesday)	Kɔku, Kwaku, Awuku	Aku, Akuwɔ
Yawoɖagbe (Thursday)	Yao, Yaw, Ayao, Kwawu	Yawa, Awo, Yaa
Fiɖagbe (Friday)	Kofi	Afua, Afi, Afiwa, Afiwɔ
Memliɖagbe (Saturday)	Kɔmi, Kwami	Ama, Ami
Kɔsiɖagbe (Sunday)	Kɔsi, Kwasi	Akɔsia, Akɔsua, Esi, Awusi

Often, people are called by their birthday name most of the time; the given name being used only on formal documents. In such cases, children with the same birth name are delineated by suffixes: -gã, meaning "big", and -vi, meaning "little". For example, after the birth of another Kofi, the first child called Kofi becomes Kofigã, and the new child Kofi. A subsequent Kofi, would be Kofivi, or Kofitse, mostly among Wedome and Tɔngu Ewes. Sometimes, the renaming happens twice, as the second Kofi might have originally been called Kofivi, while the eldest retained Kofi, thereby necessitating that they both be renamed on the birth of a third Kofi.

== Grammar ==
=== Nouns ===
==== Gender ====
Ewe only distinguishes between natural genders of humans, gods, animals, certain plants, and drums. The gender is expressed through differing words (see 1) or affixation of a word with a masculine or feminine gender onto a word with common gender (see 2).

ŋútsù
father
father

av -ũtsú
dog -MASC
"Male dog"

==== Number ====
Ewe has singular and plural number. The plural number is formed by affixing the third person plural personal pronoun to the singular.

ame =wó
person =3.PL
"people"

=== Syntax ===
Ewe is a subject–verb–object language. The possessive precedes the head noun. Adjectives, numerals, demonstratives and relative clauses follow the head noun. Ewe also has postpositions rather than prepositions.

Ewe is well known as a language having logophoric pronouns. Such pronouns are used to refer to the source of a reported statement or thought in indirect discourse, and can disambiguate sentences that are ambiguous in most other languages. The following examples illustrate:

- Kofi be e-dzo 'Kofi said he left' (he ≠ Kofi)
- Kofi be yè-dzo 'Kofi said he left' (he = Kofi)

In the second sentence, yè is the logophoric pronoun.

Ewe also has a rich system of serial verb constructions.

There are also said to be tenses by Warburton (et al. 1968), though most linguists stated that Ewe is an "aspect-prominent language".

Negation in Ewe, according to Agbedor (1994), uses a pattern that attaches a me- prefix to the verb while simultaneously adding a stand-alone o at the end of the sentence, akin to French negation.

- Kofi de suku. (K. go school)

'Kofi went to school.'

- Kofi mede suku o. (K. NEG-go school NEG)

'Kofi did not go to school.'

== Status ==
Ewe is a national language in Togo. It is also a government-backed regional language in Ghana.

== Literature ==
Scholars have identified The Tragedy of Agbezuge (Amegbetɔa alo Agbezuge ƒe Ŋutinya) by Sam J. Obianim as the first novel written in Ewe.

The Fifth landing stage by Ferdinand Kwasi Fiawoo, a play depicting a part of the history of the Ewe people, is a notable literary work as well.

== General sources ==
- Ansre, Gilbert (1961) The Tonal Structure of Ewe. MA thesis, Kennedy School of Missions of Hartford Seminary Foundation.
- Ameka, Felix Kofi (2001). "Ewe". In Garry and Rubino (eds.), Fact About the World's Languages: An Encyclopedia of the World's Major Languages, Past and Present. New York/Dublin: The H. W. Wilson Company. pp. 207–213.
- Clements, George N. (1975). "The logophoric pronoun in Ewe: Its role in discourse". Journal of West African Languages. 10(2): 141–177.
- Collins, Chris. (1993) Topics in Ewe Syntax. Doctoral Dissertation, MIT.
- Capo, Hounkpati B. C. (1991). A Comparative Phonology of Gbe, Publications in African Languages and Linguistics, 14. Berlin/New York: Foris Publications & Garome, Bénin: Labo Gbe (Int).
- Pasch, Helma (1995). Kurzgrammatik des Ewe. Köln: Köppe.
- Westermann, Diedrich Hermann (1930). A Study of the Ewe Language. London: Oxford University Press.
