= Notsé =

- Location in Togo
- Coordinates: 06°56′54″N 01°10′05″E
- Country: Togo
- Region: Plateaux Region

Notsé (also Notsie or Nuatja) is a town in the Plateaux Region of Togo. It is the capital of Haho Prefecture and is situated 95 km north of the capital Lomé. The town was formed around 1600 by the Ewe people, after they were displaced westward by the expansion of the Yoruba.

== History ==
Founded by tribes from the Nile Valley and after a transition through Oyo (Nigeria), Ketou (Benin), Adja Tado (Togo), Dogbo and Notse. Notse is the last stage of Ewe migrations around the 15th century.To protect his people from enemies and slave raiders, the chief built an imposing mud wall called "Agbogbo" 14,5 km whose remains are still visible in places. In the seventeenth century, following an internal crisis as a result of oppressive rule by Togbe Agorkoli I (Agor Akorli), the Ewe revolted and fled south, east and west to neighboring Ghana (now Volta Region) and Benin. Those who remained founded the six original quarters (Alinou, Agbaladome (Agbanadome), Adime Ekli, Tegbe and Kpedome) which have district chiefs, notables of the chief Superior who is today Agokoli IV. Notse is also the pineapple capital. The name Notse is a distortion of the word ''NOIN'' the leader of the group OUPE, who says "we stay here" in the Ewe dialect. Nuatja is a distortion of the same name by the German colonizers. Notse is located 100 km north of Lome. It is part of the Plateaux Region of which Atakpame is the chief town.

== See also ==
- Kingdom of Notsé
