= Ewe people =

West African ethnic group

Ewe
Eʋe, Eʋeawó

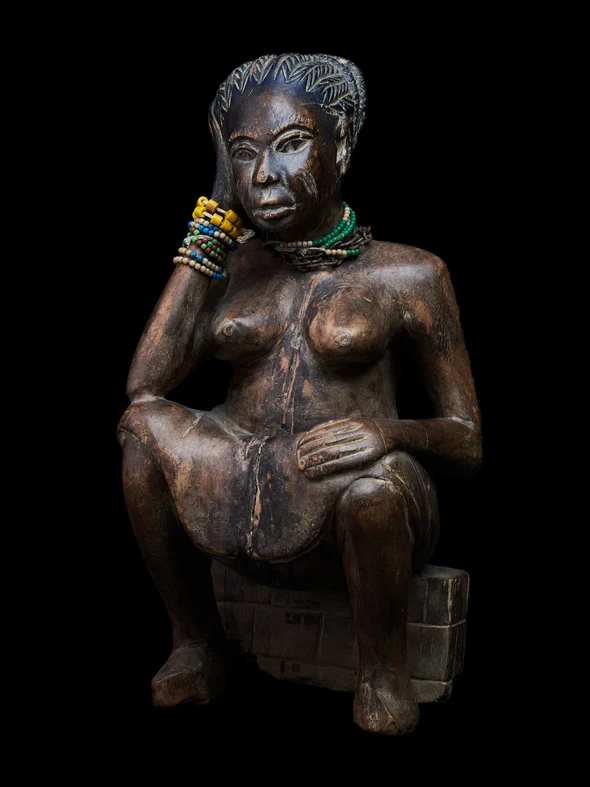
- Ewe artwork

Total population
- c. 10.3 million

Regions with significant populations
- Ghana: 6 million
- Togo: 3.1 million

Languages
- Ewe, French, English

Religion
- Christianity (50%), West African Vodun, Islam

Related ethnic groups
- Other Gbe peoples; Yoruba; GaDangme; Fon; Gen; Phla Phera; Aja; Gun

- Person: Eʋe
- People: Eʋeawó
- Language: Eʋegbě
- Country: Eʋenyígbá

The Ewe people (/ˈeɪ.weɪ/; Ewe: Eʋeawó, lit. 'Ewe people'; or Ewe: Mono Kple Amu (Volta) Tɔ́sisiwo Dome, lit. 'Between the Rivers Mono and Volta'; Ewe: Eʋenyígbá, lit. 'Eweland') are a Gbe-speaking ethnic group. The largest population of Ewe people is in Ghana (6.0 million), and the second largest population is in Togo (3.1 million). They speak the Ewe language (Ewe: Eʋegbe) which belongs to the Gbe family of languages. They are related to other speakers of Gbe languages such as the Fon, Gen, Phla/Phera, Ogu/Gun, Maxi (Mahi), and the Aja people of Togo and Benin.

== Demographics ==
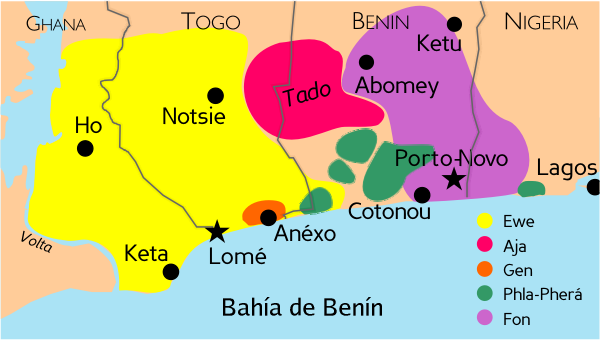
Ewe-speaking region (yellow).

Ewe people are located primarily in the coastal regions of West Africa: in the region south and east of the Volta River to around the Mono River at the border of Togo and Benin; and in the southwestern part of Nigeria (close to the Atlantic Ocean, stretching from the Nigeria and Benin border to Epe). They are primarily found in the Volta Region in southeastern and Eastern Region in Ghana and southern Togo, The Ewe region is sometimes referred to as the Ewe nation or Eʋedukɔ́ region (Togoland in colonial literature).

They consist of several groups based on their dialect and geographic concentration: the Aŋlo, Ʋedome (Danyi), Tongu or Tɔŋu. The literary language has been the Aŋlo sub-branch.

== History ==
The Ewe people were formerly known as the Dogboawo (literally the People of Dogbo), named after Dogbo, the first town they founded when they broke off from the Aja Confederacy before moving west and founding the walled city-state of Notsie. They may have migrated from a place vividly recalled in their oral history called Ketu or Amedzofe (Amejofe), a town now in the republic of Benin, in the region that is now the border between Benin and Nigeria; and then, because of invasions and wars in the 17th century, migrated into their current locations. Archaeological evidence suggests that some of the ancestors of the Ewe people likely had some presence in their current homelands at least as early as the 13th century. This evidence dates their dynamism to a much earlier period than previously believed. However, other evidence also suggests a period of turmoil, particularly when Yoruba warriors of the Oyo Empire ruled the region. Their own oral tradition describes the brutal king Agɔ Akɔli (or Agor Akorli) of Notsie (a formerly walled town in Togo), estimated to have ruled in the 17th century. The high-handedness of King Agor Akorli culminated in the escape and dispersal of the Ewe to their present locations.

They share a history with people who speak Gbe languages. All Gbe speaking people regard the Adja as the mother tribe. These speakers occupied the area between Akan land and Yorubaland. Previously, some historians have tried to tie them to both Akan and Yoruba ethnic groups. More recent studies suggest these are distinct ethnic groups who are neither Akan nor Yoruba, though they appear to have both influenced and taken influence from those groups.

The Ewe people had cordial relations with pre-slave trade and pre-colonial era Europeans. However, in 1784, they warred with Danish colonial interests as Denmark attempted to establish coastal forts in the Ewe and Yoruba regions for its officials and merchants. Nestled between powerful slave-trading kingdoms like the Asante, Dahomey and Oyo, the Ewes not only were victims of slave raiding and trade, but also sold their war captives to the Europeans. After slavery was abolished and the slave trade brought to a halt, the Ewes flourished in their major economic activities of cotton and rice farming, palm oil and copra production and exports. Their region was divided between the colonial powers, initially between the German and British colonies, and after World War I, their territories were divided between the British and a British-French joint protectorate. After World War I, the British Togoland and French Togoland were respectively renamed Trans Volta Togoland and Togo. Trans Volta Togoland later voted in a United Nations-supervised plebiscite to join the newly independent Ghana. French Togoland was renamed the Republic of Togo and gained independence from France on April 27, 1960.

There have been efforts to consolidate the Ewe peoples into one unified country since the colonial period, with many post-colonial leaders occasionally supporting their cause, but ultimately none has been successful.

Migration story of the Ewe people

== Religion ==
=== Traditional religion ===
The sophisticated theology of the Ewe people is similar to those of nearby ethnic groups, such as the Fon religion. This traditional Ewe religion is called Vodun. The word is borrowed from the Fon language, and means "spirit". The Ewe religion holds Mawu as the creator God, who created numerous lesser deities (trɔwo) that serve as the spiritual vehicles and the powers that influence a person's destiny. This mirrors the Mawu and Lisa (Goddess and God) theology of the Fon religion, and like them, these are remote from daily affairs of the Ewe people. The lesser deities are believed to have means to grant favors or inflict harm.

The Ewe have the concept of Si, which implies a "spiritual marriage" between the deity and the faithful. It is typically referred to as a suffix to a deity. Thus a Fofie-si refers to a faithful who has pledged to deity Fofie, just like a spouse would during a marriage. Ancestral spirits are important part of the Ewe traditional religion, and shared by a clan.

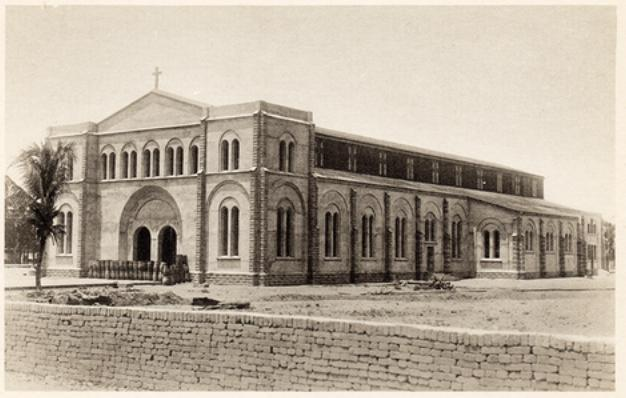
Eglise Saint-Augustin de Lomé was built in 1934 by the French.

=== Christianity ===
Christianity arrived among the Ewe people with the colonial merchants and missionaries. Major missions were established after 1840, by European colonies. German Lutheran missionaries arrived in 1847. Their ideas were accepted in the coastal areas, and Germans named their region Togoland, or Togo meaning 'beyond the sea' in Ewe language. Germans lost their influence in World War I, their Christian missions were forced to leave the Togoland, and thereafter the French and British missionaries became more prominent among the Ewe people.

About 89% of the Ewe population, particularly belonging to the coastal urban area, has converted to Christianity. However, they continue to practice the traditional rites and rituals of their ancestral religion.

== Society and culture ==
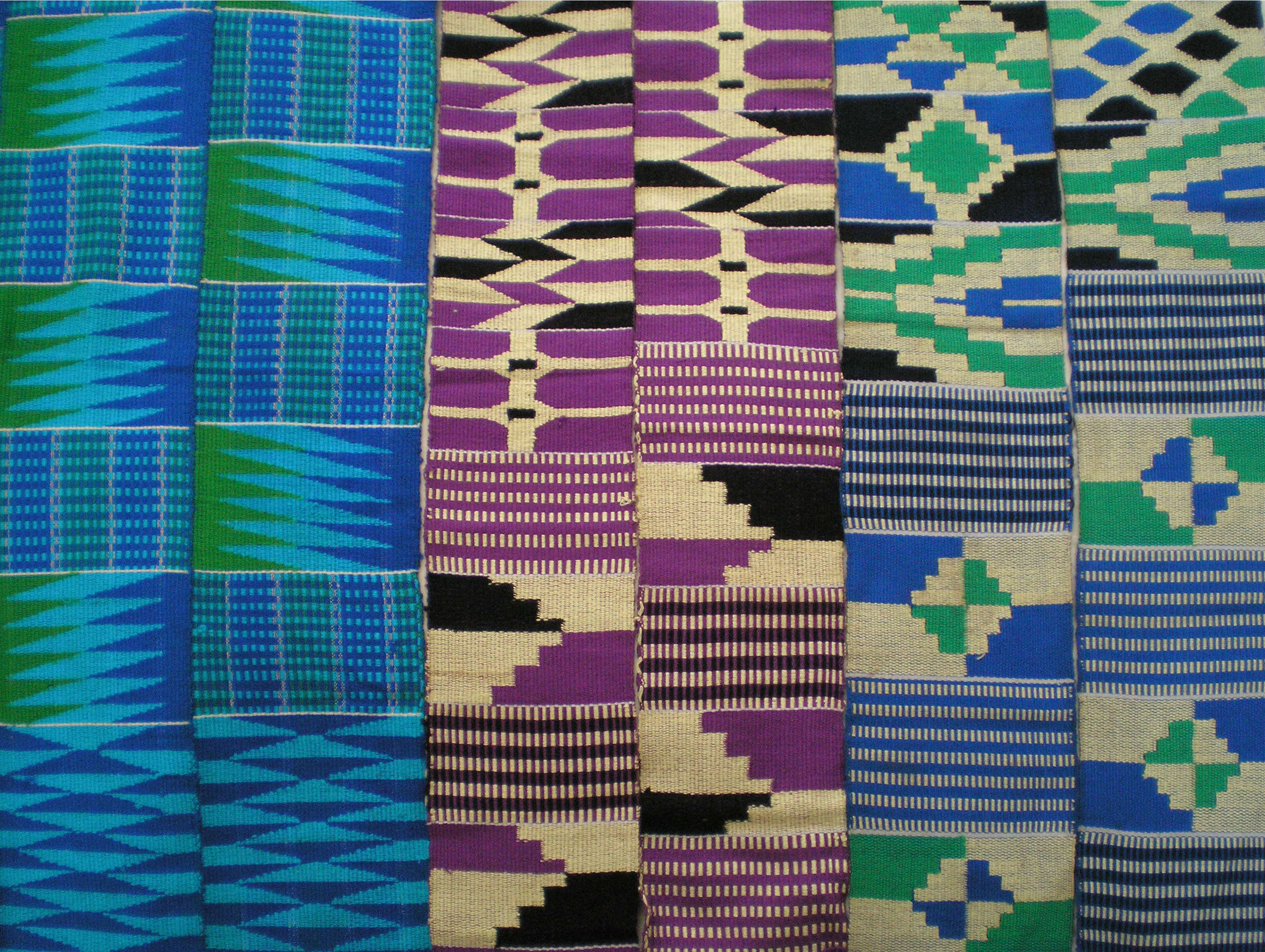
Ewe kente cloth

The Ewe people are a patrilineal people who live in towns, cities and villages that contain lineages. Each lineage is headed by the male elder. The male ancestors of Ewe are revered, and traditionally, families can trace male ancestors. The land owned by an Ewe family is considered an ancestral gift, and they do not sell this gift in any way.

Ewe people are notable for their fierce independence, and they have supported a decentralization of power within a village or through a large state. Decisions have been made by a collection of elders, and they have refused political support to wicked kings or leaders, after their experience with the powerful 17th century despot named Agor Akorli. Despite all their internal conflicts, they come together in times of war and external conflicts. In regional matters, the chief traditional priest has been the primary power. In contemporary times, the Ewes have attempted to connect and build a common culture and language-driven identity across the three countries where they are commonly found.

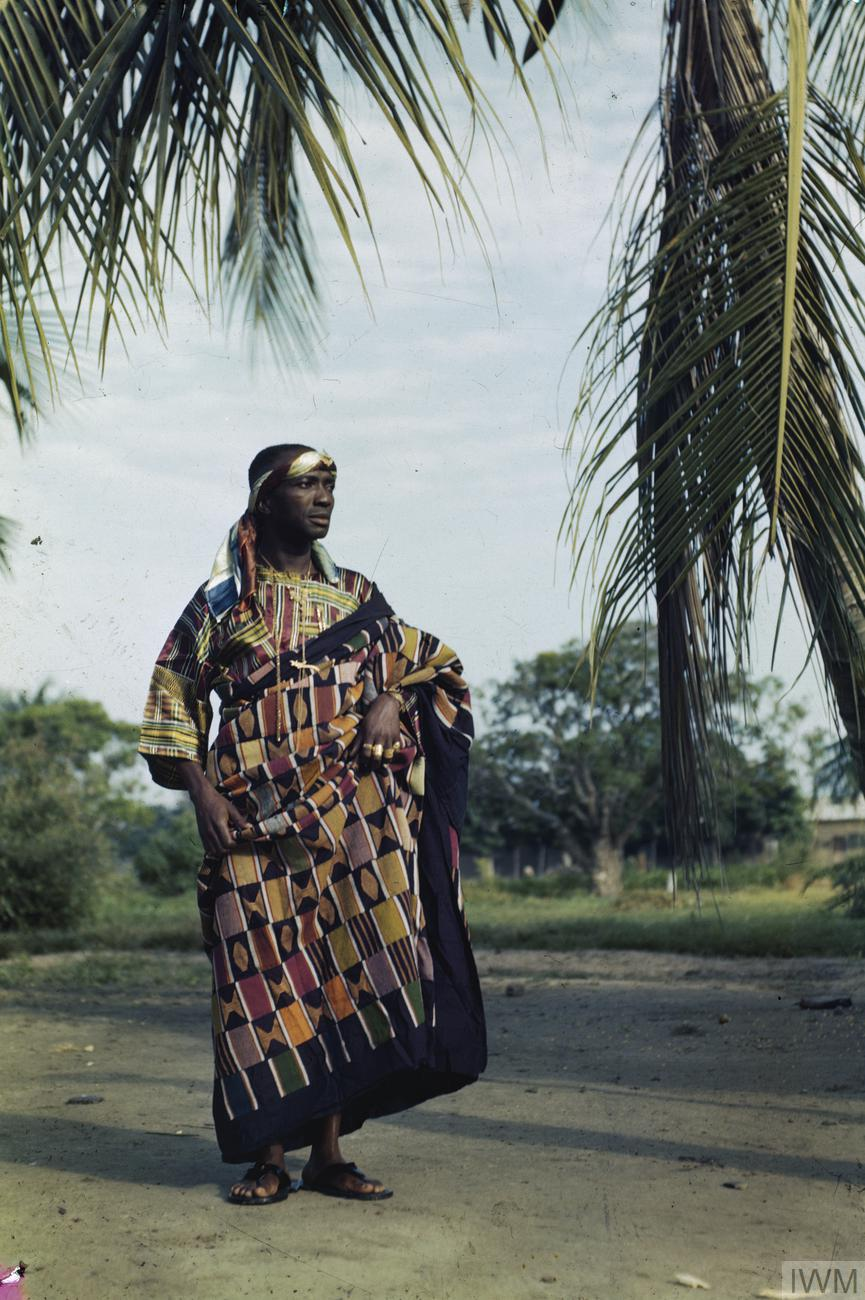
Traditional Ewe attire

While the Ewe are patrilineal, women are traditionally the major merchants and traders, both at wholesale and retail level. "They deal in a wide variety of items, many of which are produced by men."

Another notable aspect of Ewe culture, as stated by ethnologists such as Rosenthal and Venkatachalam, is their refusal to blame others, their "deep distress and voluntary acceptance of guilt" for their ancestors' role in the slave trade. They have gone to extraordinary lengths to commemorate former slaves amidst them, and making the ancestors of the slaves to be revered deities as well.

=== Textiles ===
The Ewe were known for being more than active farmers and traders, they were also known for their strip weaving. Strip weaving is a textile production technique that uses very small looms in order to produce long and narrow lengths of cloth. This produced robed, blankets, rugs, and ceremonial decorations. Strip weaving was in the interest for nomadic and village families due to how portable and easy it is to dismantle.

A defining feature of traditional textile production in the lower Volta–Niger region was the reliance on blue and white striped patterns on cloths for work and everyday wear. Indigo dye production was deeply established in the region for centuries, making indigo and unbleached handspun cotton the most accessible materials for daily garments. In contrast, cloths woven for royals, elites, and ceremonial occasions incorporated a far broader palette of colours and intricate supplementary motifs. True red yarn, however, was exceptionally difficult to produce using local plant dyes. To obtain vibrant scarlet and crimson accents, Ewe and neighbouring weavers frequently purchased imported European and Asian fabrics, such as red woolen stroud cloth or silk, and painstakingly unravelled them to extract red threads, which they then re-wove into their own strip-loom textiles.

Unlike amongst the Akan (specifically the Asante), the Ewe weaving industry was not heavily controlled by centralised royal monopolies and operated without the oversight of a centralised monarchy or ruling elite. This allowed Ewe weavers complete autonomy over their craft and allowed them to experiment with styles, express absolute individual creativity and weave without sumptuary restrictions over the centuries.

Ewe Weavers become one of the major suppliers of cloth to different ethnicities across West Africa, due to being able to satisfy both private commission and bulk buying of cloth. This also reached beyond West Africa and caught the interest of Europeans .During the American Civil War in the 1860s, European merchants attempted to source raw cotton from the modern Volta region of Ghana and modern Togo due to supply disruptions in the American South. However, large-scale raw cotton exports never took off because local producers prioritized their own domestic industry; processing raw cotton into yarn for high-value regional strip weaving yielded far greater economic returns than exporting raw lint to European buyers.

Success for the Ewe weavers was also attributed to the great creative and design flexibility they had, making them quick in producing anything that responds to market demands. This demand included the need for great copyists. Due to Ghana being newly independent, a new corporate gift fad was created which increased the demand for Ewe weavers. In the 1960s and 70s the production of cloth was too great for the Ashanti, as well as being culturally unacceptable to the elder Ashanti weavers. The need to uphold traditional standards is why the Ewe were seen as great copyists and looked at for a majority of cloth being sent out of the Ewe region, they could imitate Ashanti strip weave colours and patterns.

=== Music ===
While the Ewe are linguistically homogenous, their music differs between regions. The middle and upper Ewe groups developed a diatonic style of singing and use drums that are largely influenced by the Akan. The south region was influenced by the pentatonic singing style of the Yoruba.

The Ewes have developed a complex culture of music, closely integrated with their traditional religion. This includes Ewe drumming. Ewes believe that if someone is a good drummer, it is because they inherited a spirit of an ancestor who was a good drummer.

Ewe music has many genres. One is Agbekor, which relates to songs and music around war. These cover the range of human emotions associated with the consequences of war, from courage and solidarity inspired by their ancestors, to the invincible success that awaits Ewe warriors, to death and grief of loss.

Cross-rhythm drumming is a part of Ewe musical culture. In general, Ewe drums are constructed like barrels with wooden staves and metal rings, or carved from a single log. They are played with sticks and hands, and often fulfill roles that are traditional to the family. The 'child' or 'baby brother' drum, kagan, usually plays on the off-beats in a repeated pattern that links directly with the bell and shaker ostinatos. The 'mother' drum, kidi, usually has a more active role in the accompaniment. It responds to the larger sogo or 'father' drum. The entire ensemble is led by the atsimevu or 'grandfather' drum, largest of the group.

Lyrical songs are more prevalent in the southern region. In the north, flutes and drums generally take the place of the singer's voice.

=== Dance ===
The Ewe have an intricate collection of dances, which vary between geographical regions and other factors. One such dance is the Adevu (Ade - hunting, Vu - dance). This is a professional dance that celebrates the hunter. They are meant both to make animals easier to hunt and to give animals a ritual "funeral" in order to prevent the animal's spirit from returning and harming the hunter.

Another dance, the Agbadza, is traditionally a war dance but is now used in social and recreational situations to celebrate peace. War dances are sometimes used as military training exercises, with signals from the lead drum ordering the warriors to move ahead, to the right, go down, etc. These dances also helped in preparing the warriors for battle and upon their return from fighting they would act out their deeds in battle through their movements in the dance.

The Atsiagbekor is a contemporary version of the Ewe war dance Atamga (Great (ga) Oath (atama) in reference to the oaths taken by people before proceeding into battle. The movements of this present-day version are mostly in platoon formation and are not only used to display battle tactics, but also to energize and invigorate the soldiers. Today, Atsiagbekor is performed for entertainment at social gatherings and at cultural presentations.

The Atsia dance, which is performed mostly by women, is a series of stylistic movements dictated to dancers by the lead drummer. Each dance movement has its own prescribed rhythmic pattern, which is synchronized with the lead drum. "Atsia" in the Ewe language means style or display.

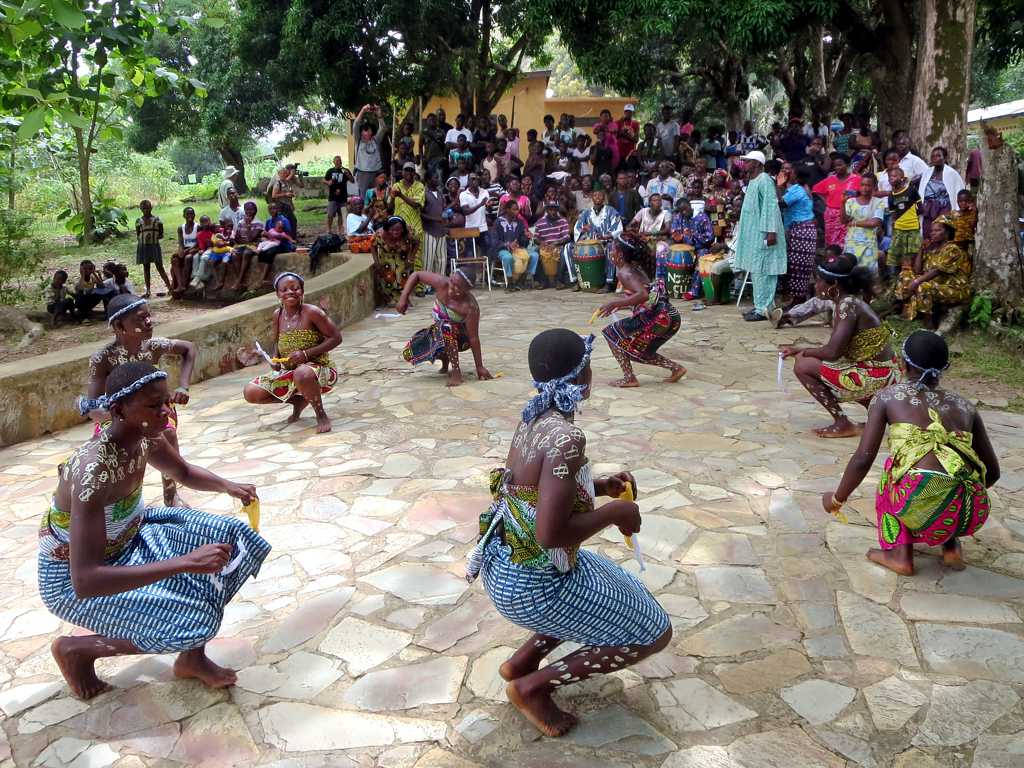
Traditional Ewe dancers performing the bɔbɔbɔ

The Bobobo (originally "Akpese") is said to have been developed by Francis Kojo Nuatro. He is thought to have been an ex-police officer who organized a group in the mid- to late 1940s. The dance has its roots from Wusuta and in the Highlife music popular across West African countries. Bobobo gained national recognition in the 1950s and 1960s because of its use at political rallies and the novelty of its dance formations and movements. It is generally performed at funerals and other social occasions. This is a social dance with a great deal of room for free expression. In general, the men sing and dance in the center while the women dance in a ring around them. There are "slow" and "fast" versions of Bobobo. The slow one is called Akpese and the fast one is termed Bobobo.

Agahu is the name of a dance as well as one of the many secular music associations (clubs) of the Ewe people of Togo, Dahomey, and in the south-eastern part of the Volta Region. Each club (Gadzok, Takada, and Atsiagbeko are other such clubs) has its own distinctive drumming and dancing, as well as its own repertoire of songs. A popular social dance of West Africa, Agahu was created by the Egun speaking people from the town of Ketonu in what is now Benin. From there it spread to the Badagry area of Nigeria, where inhabitants of the Ewe Settlement, mostly fishermen, heard and adapted it. In dancing the Agahu, two circles are formed; the men stay stationary with their arms out and then bend with a knee forward for the women to sit on. They progress around the circle until they arrive at their original partner.

Gbedzimido is a war dance mostly performed by the people of Mafi-Gborkofe and Amegakope in the Central Tongu district of Ghana's Volta Region. Gbedzimido has been transformed into a contemporary dance, and is usually seen only on very important occasions like the Asafotu festival, celebrated annually by the Tongu people around December. The dance is also performed at the funerals of highly-placed people in society, mostly men. Mafi-Gborkofe is a small farming village near Mafi-Kumase.

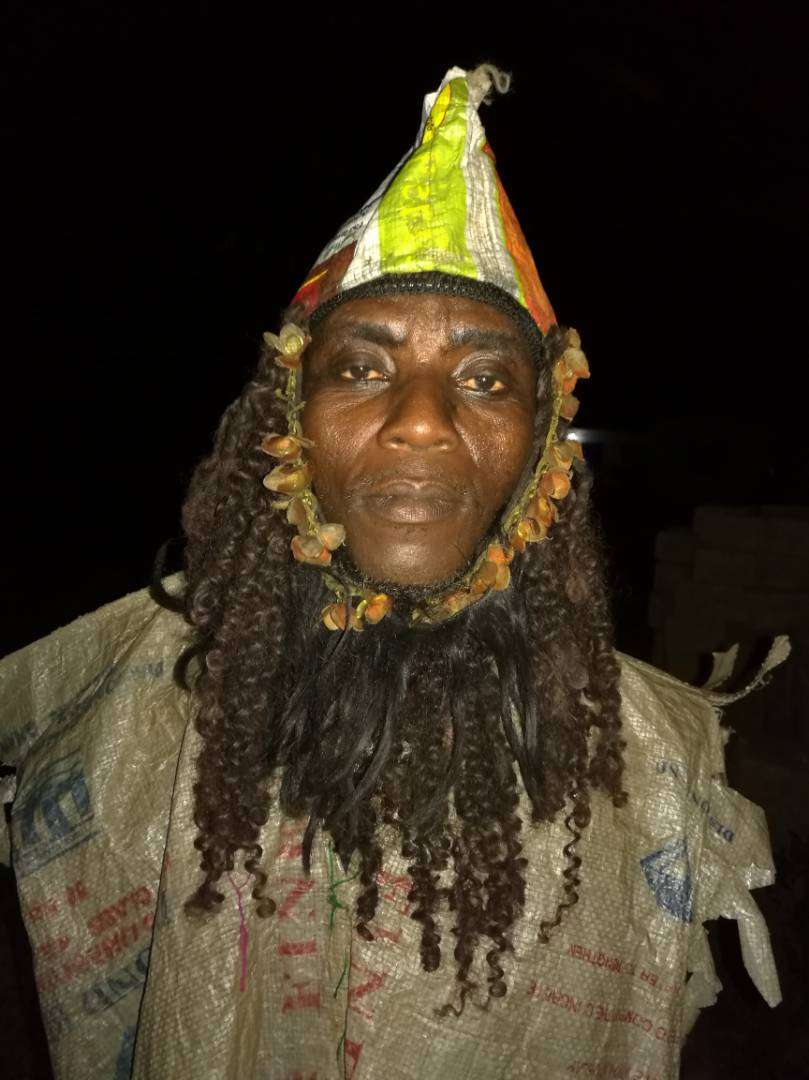
A Gbedzimido dancer [entertainer] in his hand-made attire

Gota uses the mystical calabash drum of Benin, West Africa. The calabash was originally called the "drum of the dead" and was played only at funerals. It is now performed for social entertainment. The most exciting parts of Gota are the synchronized stops of the drummers and dancers.

Tro-u is ancestral drum music that is played to invite ancestors to special sacred occasions at a shrine. For religious purposes, a priest or priestess would be present. There are fast and slow rhythms that can be called by the religious leader in order to facilitate communication with the spirit world. The bell rhythm is played on a boat-shaped bell in the north, but the southern region uses a double bell. The three drums must have distinct pitch levels in order to lock in.

Sowu is one of the seven different styles of drumming that belong to the cult of Yewe, adapted for stage. Yewe is the God of Thunder and lightning among the Ewe speaking people of Togo, Benin, and in south-eastern parts of the Volta Region. Yewe is a very exclusive cult and its music is one of the most developed forms of sacred music in Eweland.

=== Education ===
A key aspect of Ewe culture is a philosophy about how to interpret and educate oneself through life's events. The Ewe traditionally pass on generational wisdom through proverbs, many of which aim to contextualize the cultural reverence of life-long education. The traditional Ewe proverb which states "knowledge is like the Baobab Tree and no one can wrap the hands fully around it" exemplifies a profound appreciation of continual self-betterment, even if such a process will never realistically conclude within a natural lifetime.

In the post-colonial era, the Ewe people have acquired renown among Africans for their pursuit of academia and higher education. Many Ewe people travel across the world to pursue their education at leading institutions, following the aforementioned cultural motivations to enhance their knowledge base, and status among other Ewes. Of those who pursue higher education, many Ewe people attain graduate degrees in technical fields such as finance, engineering and law.

== Language ==
Region between rivers Mono and Volta
- People: Eʋeawo
- Language: Eʋegbe
- Country: Eʋedukɔ

The flag of the Ewe people.

Ewe, also written Evhe, or Eʋe, is a major dialect cluster of Gbe or Tadoid (Capo 1991, Duthie 1996) spoken in the Volta Region, in Ghana and across southern Togo, to the Togo-Benin border by about three million people. Ewe belongs to the Gbe family of Niger-Congo. Gbe languages are spoken in an area that extends predominantly from Togo, Benin and as far as Western Nigeria to Lower Weme.

Ewe dialects vary. Groups of villages that are two or three kilometres apart use distinct varieties. Nevertheless, across the Ewe-speaking area, the dialects may be broadly grouped geographically into coastal or southern dialects, e.g., Aŋlɔ, Tɔŋú Avenor, Watsyi and inland dialects characterised indigenously as Ewedomegbe, e.g., Lomé, Danyi, and Kpele etc. (Agbodeka 1997, Gavua 2000, Ansre 2000). Speakers from different localities understand each other and can identify the peculiarities of the different areas. Additionally, there is a written standard that was developed in the nineteenth century based on the regional variants of the various sub-dialects with a high degree of coastal content. With it, a standard colloquial variety has also emerged (spoken usually with a local accent), and is used very widely in cross-dialectal contact sites such as schools, markets, and churches.

The storytellers use a dialect of Aŋlɔ spoken in Seva. Their language is the spoken form and hence does not necessarily conform to the expectations of someone familiar with the standard dialect. For instance, they use the form yi to introduce relative clauses instead of the standard written si, and yia 'this' instead of the standard written sia. They sometimes also use subject markers on the verb agreeing with the lexical NP subject while this is not written in the standard. A distinctive feature of the Aŋlɔ dialect is that the sounds made in the area of the teeth ridge are palatalised when followed by a high vowel. For instance, the verb tsi 'become old' is pronounced "tsyi" by the storyteller Kwakuga Goka.

=== Ewe diaspora ===
As the Ewe demographic is a sparse but contributing population in West Africa, there have been organizations such as CEANA The Council of Ewe Association of North America which aim to fund and initiate development projects and schools in Eweland, comprising Ghana, Benin, and Togo, while preserving the Ewe culture in the diaspora.

== Notable Ewe ==
- Sylvanus Olympio - First Togolese President
- Nicolas Grunitzky - Second president of Togo
- Jerry John Rawlings - Former President of The Republic of Ghana and Flight Lieutenant of the Ghana Air Force
- Emmanuel Kwasi Kotoka - Former Military Lieutenant General
- Joseph Kokou Koffigoh - Former prime minister of Togo
- Edem Kodjo - Former Secretary General of the Organisation of African Unity and Togolese Prime Minister
- Nicephore Soglo - Former president of Benin
- Komla Agbeli Gbedemah - Ghanaian politician
- John Willie Kofi Harlley - Ghanaian politician
- Anthony Deku - Ghanaian politician
- Bella Bellow - Former Togolese musician
- Willie Klutse - Ghanaian footballer
- Raphael Armattoe - First ever African nominee for a Nobel Prize
- Esther Ocloo - Ghanaian businesswoman
- Philip Gbeho - Composer of Ghana's national anthem
- Ephraim Amu - Musician and composer
- Fred Kwasi Apaloo - Ghanaian politician
- Kofi Awoonor - Ghanaian politician
- Annie Ruth Jiagge - Ghanaian politician
- Isaac Dogboe - World Champion boxer
- Monica Amekoafia - Beauty queen
- Joseph Agbeko - Boxer
- Sefadzi Abena Amesu - Musician
- Kofi Adjorlolo - Veteran Ghanaian actor, producer and media personality
- Marie Thérèse Metoyer - Businesswoman
- Edward Doe Adjaho - Ghanaian politician
- Junior Agogo - Ghanaian footballer
- Cody Gakpo - Footballer
- Alexander Djiku - Footballer
- Romeo Lavia - Footballer
- Bradley Barcola - Footballer
- Corentin Tolisso - Footballer
- Patrick Attipoe - World War II veteran and former Corporal
- MzVee - Musician
- M.anifest - Musician and record producer
- E.L. - Musician and producer
- Stonebwoy - Award winning musician
- Feli Nuna - Musician and producer
- Francis Amuzu - Footballer
- Christian Atsu - Former footballer for Newcastle United F.C and Chelsea
- Constance Ama Emefa Edjeani-Afenu - First female brigadier general of the Ghana Armed Forces and, posthumously, the first female major general.
- Edward Kwaku Utuka - Former Major General of Ghana Armed Forces
- Seth Anthony - Former Army Major and the first black African-born soldier to be commissioned as an officer in the British Army
- Virgil Abloh - Ghanaian-American fashion designer and founder of OFF-WHITE
- Komla Dumor - Journalist
- Nyaho Nyaho-Tamakloe - Former president Ghana Football Association and politician
- Victoria Zormelo-Gorleku - First woman prison Officer in Ghana
- Ben Akafia - Former Lieutenant General and Chief of defence staff
- G.K. Agama - Former economist and governor of the bank of Ghana
- Kofi Anyidoho - Poet and Professor of Literature
- Charity Zormelo - First Woman to graduate from the Gold Coast
- Ferdinand Kwasi Fiawoo - Religious minister and Educator
- Ferdinand K. D. Goka - Volta region minister and politician
- Christian Baëta - Presbyterian minister Synod Clerk
- V. Kofi Agawu - Musicologist and music theorist
- El Anatsui - Sculptor
- Gnonnas Pedro - Singer and Musician
- Mac Sarbah - Foundation executive
- Tsatsu Tsikata - Ghanaian academic and lawyer
- Jones Victor Mawulorm Dotse - Ghanaian judge

== See also ==
- Ewe music
- Ewe drumming
- Anlo Ewe
- Avenor Ewe
- Agbadza
