= Tsiame =

Town in Volta region of Ghana

Tsiame is a town north of Anloga and the Keta Lagoon in the Volta Region of Ghana. The town is part of Keta Municipal. Tsiame is located close to both Avenorpeme and the settlement of Gbetuinu both the Volta Region.

== Geospatial location ==
Tsiame can be found on the map with geocodes; Latitude; 5° 59′ 57″ north and on longitude 0° 51′ 28″ east.
