= Abor, Ghana =

Abor Abↄ Abaw, Abo
- Town
- Location in Ghana
- Coordinates: 6°03′39″N 0°51′49″E
- Country: Ghana
- Region: Volta Region
- District: Keta Municipal District
- Elevation: 55 m (180 ft)

Population
  - Ethnicities: Anlo Ewe
- Time zone: GMT
  - Summer (DST): GMT

Abor (Abaw, Abↄ) is a town in the Keta Municipal District of the Volta Region in southeast Ghana. Abor lies east of the Volta River and just north of the Keta Lagoon. Abor is known for Abor Senior High School, often referred to as ABORSCO. The school is a second cycle institution.

== History ==
Abor is home to the Anlo Ewe people who migrated there in the later part of the seventeenth century. They formed the Anlo Kingdom of which Abor was a part.

From the European perspective Abor was a part of the Dutch "area of influence" of Keta beginning about 1784, until taken over by the British and then folded into the British Gold Coast colony, which subsequently became Ghana.
