= Anloga District =

Administrative district in Volta Region, Ghana

Anloga Municipal Aŋlɔga Nutome
- District
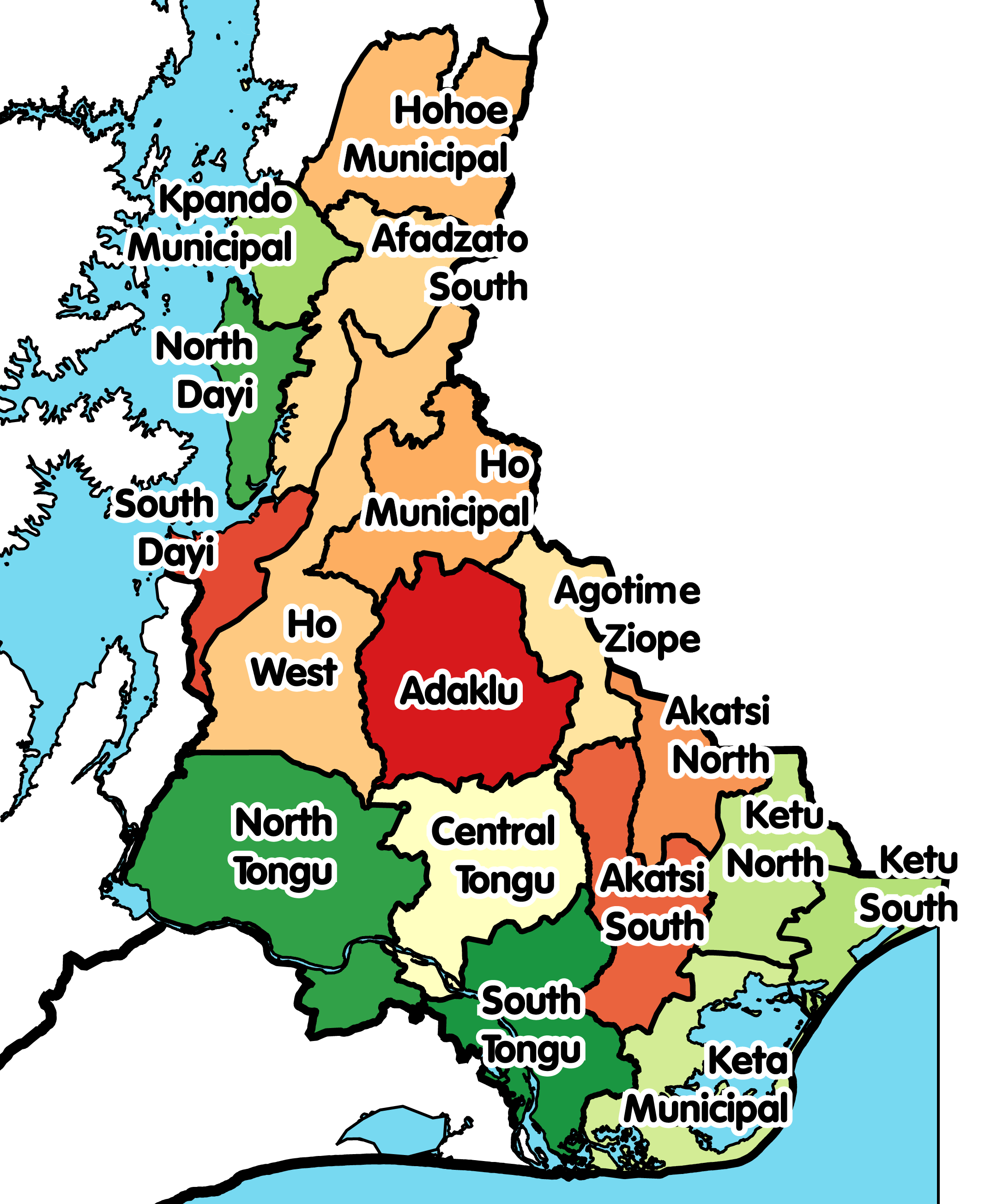
- Districts of Volta Region

- Location of Anloga Municipal within Volta
- Coordinates: 5°47′13.7″N 0°53′25.8″E
- Country: Ghana
- Region: Volta
- Capital: Anloga

Government
  - Municipal Chief Executive: Hon. Sandra Seyram Kpedor
  - Awormefia of Anlo State: Togbui Sri III

Area
  - Total: 314 km^{2} (121 sq mi)

Population (2021)
  - Total: 94,895
  - Density: 302/km^{2} (783/sq mi)
- Time zone: UTC+0 (GMT)
- Ghana Post GPS: VK
- Area code: 03626
- ISO 3166 code: GH-TV-AL

Anloga Municipal is one of the eighteen districts in Volta Region, Ghana. Originally it was formerly part of the then-larger Keta District on 10 March 1989, which was created from the former Anlo District Council. However on 19 February 2019, the western part of the district was split off to create Anloga District (which is now Anloga Municipal Assembly) as one of six districts inaugurated by the Akufo-Addo Government, thus the remaining part has been retained as Keta Municipal District. The Municipal assembly is located in the southwest part of the Keta basin in the southern part of the Volta Region and has Anloga, the spiritual, cultural and traditional capital of the Anlo Kingdom as its Municipal capital town.

== Populated places ==
The largest town in the district is the capital, Anloga. Some of the villages include Alakple, Kodzi, Dzita, Dewegodo, Dewenu, Srogboe, Whuti, Atsito, Fiaxor, Deta, Genui, Benadzi, Azanu, Apklorfudzi, Tregui, Trekume, Bleamezado, Dosukorpe, Lividzi, Agortoe, Salo, Nyikutor, Atorkor, Woe, Tegbi, Abor, Aŋloga, Anyaŋui, Tunu, Akplowotorkor, and Fuveme.

== People ==
The main ethnic group in the Anloga District are the Ewe people. The main Ewe group are the Anlo Ewe. Their leader and king is the Awormefia of Anlo, Togbui Sri III.

== Administration ==
The District administration is based at Anloga. The head of its administration is the District Chief Executive (DCE) who is appointed by the President of Ghana in the person of Seth Yormenu. The current DCE as at April, 2026 is Madam Sandra Seyram Kpedor.
