= 1960s in Ghana =

1960s in Ghana details events of note that happened in Ghana in the years 1960 to 1969.

== Incumbents ==
- President: Kwame Nkrumah from 1960 to 1966

== Events ==
- 1960 - Ghana becomes a republic. Kwame Nkrumah becomes the country's first elected president.
- 1964 - Kwame Nkrumah declares that there will be no other political party apart from the Convention People's Party (CPP).
- February 1966 - Kwame Nkrumah overthrown in a coup d'état by Emmanuel Kwasi Kotoka.
- August 1969 - First presidential election since independence held.

== National holidays ==
- January 1: New Year's Day
- March 6: Independence Day
- May 1: Labor Day
- December 25: Christmas
- December 26: Boxing Day

In addition, several other places observe local holidays, such as the foundation of their town. These are also "special days."
