= Anlo Senior High School =

Coordinates: 5.8074°N 0.9309°E

- Anloga; Volta Region; Ghana

Information
- Type: Senior High School
- Motto: Truth and Service
- Established: 1954; 72 years ago
- Category: Category B
- School code: 0070501
- Gender: Male / Female
- Enrollment: Over 2,000
- Slogan: The Star of Anlo Land
- Alumni: Anlo SHS Alumni Association (ANSSOSA)

Anlo Senior High School, also known as ANSECO, is a category B mixed public senior high school located at Anloga in the Keta District, Volta Region of Ghana. ANSECO is the fourth largest school in the Volta Region, with a student population of approximately 2,000 students.

== History ==
Anseco was initially established in August 1954 headed by Mr. Tetteh Logah but due to low enrolment and inadequate fund amidst remnants of the political and social unrest at that time the school could not merit absorption into the public school system leading to its collapse in the last quarter of 1958. It all began when the political upheavals which led to the devastating riots in Anloga in 1953 affected both the socio-economic lives of the people which caused the transfer of the first secondary school, Zion College of West Africa (formerly the New Africa University College (NAFRICO) from Anloga to Vui near Keta. This led to leaving students enrolled in the school from Anloga stranded so in sympathy with the paramountcy and the abandoned students, the founding fathers of Anseco, Torgbui Adeladza II; the Awoamefia of Anlo Traditional Area, Mr. C. K. Fiagbe and Mr J. W. K. Doe quickly responded by re-establishing the Anlo High School at Anloga on April 10, 1959. Mr J. W. K. Doe provided a modest temporary home known as "God Lives House," with Rev. Dr. Ferdinand K. Fiawoo providing furniture and Mr. Isaiah Y. Fiagbe helping administratively by serving as its first headmaster during the re-establishment.

After its establishment, the school has faced several challenges such as inadequate infrastructure, scarce qualified teaching staff, poor student patronage, and financial limitations reliant on community fundraising. Hence, several organizations such as Anlo Welfare Unions in cities like Kumasi, Koforidua, and Takoradi as well as individual contributions came through to help sustain operations until its integration into Ghana's public education system during the 1963/64 academic year.

After the tenure of Mr. Isaiah Y. Fiagbe as the first headmaster during the re-establishment of the school from 1959 to 1960, Mr. Evans Agbottah also served until late 1963 to early 1964 where he provided guidance for the school until its absorption into the public education system which was lobbied for by Mr. Joe Aidam, the then DC of Anlo. Mr Fiagbe was the succeeded by Mr. Sosthenes Doe Sorkpor from 1964 spanning 24 years of leadership where he acquired a permanent site, constructed its first classroom block, and oversaw the first cohort of students for the General Certificate of Education (Ordinary Level) in 1966. Other headmasters who served include Mr. Ozias Tamekloe and Mr. Paul Treve.

Other people who served the school as headmasters such as Mr. E. K. Keteku, who established the school's Police Cadet Corps to enhance discipline and extracurricular engagement. In the year 2006, Mr. Wilberforce I. K. Azumah assumed the headship where he introduced administrative reforms with collaboration from the Board of Governors on infrastructure upgrades, including plans for expanded facilities to support the growing student body of 1,251 at the time. Hence, in 2008, he advocated for reviving the school's education endowment fund through old students' contributions to bolster resources. Fast forward in 2024, Mr. Wisdom Kwame Adeti assumed the headship position where he actively appealed to contractors for the completion of essential projects like the kitchen and dining hall to improve boarding facilities.

Currently, the school has 97 teaching staff and 62 non-teaching staff.

== School code ==
The Ghana Education Service has assigned the code 0070501 for administrative purposes, including student registrations, placements, and national examinations such as the West African Senior School Certificate Examination (WASSCE) to Anlo Senior High School.

== School motto ==
The official motto of Anlo Senior High School is Truth and Service which was adopted reiterating the school’s commitment to fostering integrity, dedication, and community-oriented values among its students.

== Academic programs and extra-curricular activities ==
Anlo Senior High School like any other senior high school in Ghana functions within the standard three-year Senior High School (SHS) curriculum framework established by Ghana's National Council for Curriculum and Assessment (NaCCA). Currently, Anseco runs six programs which include the following;

- Agriculture
- Business
- Home Economics
- Visual Arts
- General Arts
- General Science

Also, extra-curricular activities at Anseco include Maths & Science Quiz, Sports and Games, Cadet Club Activities etc.

== Facilities ==
Anseco has the following facilities;

- Science Laboratories
- Library
- Dining Hall
- Dormitories (Boys and Girls)
- Agricultural laboratory
- Visual arts studio
- ICT/computer laboratory
- Kitchen
- Sport Fields

== Notable alumni ==
ANSECO has an array of old students including

- Richard Kwame Sefe, Hon. Member of Parliament for Anlo Constituency.

== Achievements ==
Notable achievements of Anseco include:

- Champions in the 9th National Constitution Game Championship in 2009, where it represented the Volta Region as civic education club champions, defeating finalists from other regions and earning a trophy along with educational resources to support classroom learning.

== See also ==
- Education in Ghana
- List of Senior High Schools in Ghana
