= Nautyca =

Jeffery Gordor
- Born: 6 December 1992; Anloga, Volta Region
- Origin: Ghana
- Genres: Hi-Life, afropop
- Occupation: Musician

Jeffery Kofi Gordor, better known as Nautyca, is a Ghanaian singer-songwriter.

== Early life and career ==
Nautyca was born on 6 December 1992 in Anloga, Volta Region of Ghana and grew up in Tema. He started as a rapper and later developed into high life singing. His debut single "Social Media" which featured Sarkodie became a hit few days after release.

== Discography ==
Singles

$\bull$ Social Media (2019)

$\bullet$ Dane (2020)

== Awards and nominations ==
Nautyca was crowned the Rising Artist of the Year 2019 at the Youth Excellence Awards (YEA).
