= Keta Sea Defence =

Sea defence wall in Ghana

The Keta Sea Defence Wall in Ghana was done to defend the coastline from Keta to Hlorve. The defence was constructed to prevent chronic and occasional erosion along the coast and flooding. Also to reclaim land from the Keta Lagoon to widen human settlements and also to build a way linking settlements from Keta to Hlorve. A World Bank analysis from 2010 presents a bleak picture for the remainder of Ghana.

== Construction ==
The construction of the 41-million Euro sea defence began in October 2010 and was projected to be completed by December 2011 but was completed in October 2014. The quantity of the dredge was estimated at 15 million cubic meters and the vessel type used was the Cutter Suction Dredge.

The first phase for the construction of the defense also known as the Blekuso Project started in 2015 and was completed.

The second phase for the construction of the defense was expected to cover about 8 km minimum along the coastal stretch.

The amount set for the project was $100-million.

== Tidal waves ==
In June 2015, about 56 houses in the towns of Dzita and Fuveme in the Keta Municipality were destroyed by tidal waves leaving 627 people homeless. Also in June 2016, tidal waves destroyed the towns of Agbledomi, Fuveme, Whuti, Srogboe, Dzita, and Kporkporgbor leaving hundreds of people homeless and destroying farmlands and properties.

On 7 November 2021, tidal waves swept through human settlements in the Keta Municipality and Ketu Municipality displacing about 3,000 people. Affected communities were Kedzikope, Abutiakope, Dzelukope, Dzita, Anloga, Agbledomi, Atiteti, Agokedzi, Serakope Fuveme and Keta Central. The waves destroyed fishing equipment, farm animals and many households.

=== Government intervention ===
The Government of Ghana allocated about 10million Ghana cedis for the communities affected by the tidal waves.

==== Appeal ====
Togbi Edido II, the Chief of Xorvi pleaded with the government to solve the issues on the waves and also appealed to the government to make sure the Keta lagoon is dredged to reclaim lands lost for development in the communities.

Torgbi Adamah III, the paramount chief of Some Traditional Area also pleaded with the government to begin the second of the project to reduce the damage caused by the sea on settlements along the shore.

== Controversies ==
In December 2021, Mathew Opoku Prempeh in a video that went viral on social media was alleged to have said he would lead a demonstration in Kumasi if Ken Ofori-Atta, the Minister for Finance accepts the request of the Minority in Parliament concerning the sea defence project. The public condemned him as being 'insensitive' to the plight of the Keta people. He later claimed he supports the project 100% and disputed claims his comments was not based on ethnic bias.

John Agyekum Kuffour blamed the NDC of wasting funds meant for the sea defence project whiles John Mahama also blamed the NPP for sidelining the Volta region in terms of infrastructural projects.

In the 2022 budget read by Ken Ofori-Atta, the sea defence project was not captured and Francis Asenso Boakye claimed he was disappointed.
