= Seva, Ghana =

Seva
- Town & Municipality Capital
- Location in Ghana
- Coordinates: 5°59′4.3″N 0°56′29.09″E
- Country: Ghana
- Region: Volta Region
- District: Keta Municipal District

Population (2012)
  - Total: 22,739
  - Density: 1,829/sq mi (706/km^{2})
- Time zone: GMT
  - Summer (DST): GMT
- Area code: +233 (3626)

Seva, Ghana is located in the Keta Lagoon in the Keta district now Municipal of Ghana. Seva is one of the islands forming the archipelago of the Keta Lagoon. It covers an area of approximately 2.7 square miles. This island is important as a bird-watching site because it is a stopover point for many migratory birds. The town has many attractions such as the sandy beaches, general cleanliness and local storytelling in Ewe. Historians are unable to determine a date for the founding of the town.

== History of Seva ==
The people of Seva are part of the Ewe who migrated from Notsie in the Republic of Togo Seva is divided into the north (Adziehe) and South (Anyiehe) divisions. However, one can construct a time frame from oral tradition and artefacts especially about those of the early chiefs and wars. The settlement must have begun before 1700.

There are three Chieftaincy Stools in Seva, namely Lotsu Makwa, Adzomani and Adoblanui-Xornyo Stools. The Lotsu Makwa Stool is the Dufia Stool or Senior Chief Stool. Its occupant, Lotsu Makwa IV, has abdicated, but which abdication is not recognized by the Anlo Traditional Council. The current occupant of the Adzomani Stool is Togbi Adzomani II, while the Adoblanui-Xornyo Stool has a regent, Gabriel Agbewole (Abbeworle), the last occupant of the Stool, Togbi Atsapo-Xornyo, known in private life as Richard Kofi Atsakpo, having died on December 24, 2013.

The island was important as a bird watching site. It is inhabited by a large community of Anlo-Ewe-speaking people. Their major vocation is Kete cloth weaving. They also are engaged in fishing.

The AME Zion Church was the first to establish its presence in Seva and came along with a school which now serves the junior high school level. The AME church has got a stronghold in the town and has created a school.

The town has many attractions including local storytelling in Ewe which is undertaken as a pastime activity The greatest challenge of the town is lack of pipe-borne water. All inhabitants of Seva township harvest rain water and store it in tanks for use by the households and the schools.

== Music in Seva ==
The people of Seva are noted for their expertise in music and dance. They are experts in the African rattle music (xatsevu) and the singing of halo songs (songs of abuse).

== Occupations in Seva ==
Seva is one of the renowned locations for the weaving industry among the Ewe people and which were frequented by Yoruba and Hausa traders, the main clientele traveled from Nigeria to the Keta and Agbozume markets in the Volta Region, Ghana. Another important occupation is fishing. Crabs, shrimps and tilapia are caught in the Keta Lagoon. The area is a critical area of salt production in the Keta area.

The main mode of transportation was sail boats before the town was connected by a feeder road to Anyako-Konu.
