= Alakple =

Coordinates: 5°52′N 0°53′E

- Interactive map of Alakple
- Country: Ghana
- Region: Volta Region

Alakple is a town in the Keta Municipality of the Volta Region of Ghana. This town is situated along the south western part of the Keta lagoon. The bust of the prominent African American boxer Muhammad Ali is planted at the junction along the Anloga and Dabala road. That road leads to Alakple. This town is prominent for the historical role it plays in the area. It is the home of the Nyigbla, 'god of war' who rode on horseback. The major clan in the town is Ameawo who are the custodians or clan responsible for nugbidodo 'settling disputes'. They are also believed to have control of all palm trees in Anloland. As custodians of Torgbi Nyigbla there are many taboos related to their dressing and food. for instance they are forbidden to wear shirts or blouse and sandals within the shrine.

== History ==
It is believed that the people of Alakple who are from the Amea clan arrived in Anloland before Torgbi Wenya's arrival in Anloga. The founder of the Ameawo clan was Mahu Ahafia. Alakple had a large influx of Ga Dangme refugees who escaped the Akwamu wars of the 17th century. Majority of the refugees migrated from Lakpleku. The migrants gave the name Alakple to their new settlement in reference to their old settlement of Lakpleku. Lakpleku is related to Ladoku, Labadi and Larteh Akwapim.

The totem of the Ameawo clan is Avutsu (male dog). This was a fetish that was given to the people of Alakple by Tsali (a mystic man from Tsiame and founder of Tsiame clan) to protect the people from the attack of wild animals.

=== Taboos ===
- Wearing of shirts, blouses/tops and sandals is prohibited within the Torgbi Nyigbla shrine
- It is a taboo for the people of Alakple to shout loud with the intention of drawing attention to ones woes,
- It is a taboo to whistle in Alakple town
- It is a taboo to fry fish with palm kernel oil
- The Amee clan members do not eat smoked crab
- Amee clan members do not eat crocodile
- It is a taboo to bring or rear or keep a dog in Alakple. Amee clan members are not to be touched by a dog; when touched, they have to touch back with their feet otherwise they suffer from a dreadful skin disease

=== Slave trade ===
It was reported that people of Alakple took part in the slave trade which transpired in Anlo hence as the terms of peace signed by the Danes with the Anlo on 18 June 1784, after the Danes had burnt Anlo settlements like Atokor, Whuti, Alakple, Anloga, Woe and Tegbee, the Danes inserted a provision which required the Anlo "to deliver up to ten sons of their principal people as hostages to assure the carrying out of the terms, the hostages to be sent out of the country as slaves in the event of the breach of the treaty."

== Occupation ==
The natives are noted for their fishing activities in the Keta Lagoon and in the creeks which enter the lagoon such as the Todzi. They are also important crafts men noted for their entrepreneurial skills. Poultry farming and bird rearing are undertaken in almost every household which are sold in Anloga and Keta Markets. During the dry season the women take part in weaving of straw mats for sale in the Keta Market.

== Prominent people from Alakple ==
- Hon Clement Humado is the Member of Parliament of the Keta Constituency. He was born in 1953 in this town since his parents are natives of Alakple.
- Torgbi Kporku III is prominent in business and consultancy and is the Dufia of the town. He was the consultant for the Keta Sea Defense Project.

He was the Ambassador to Japan during the reign of our late father Lt. Jerry John Rawlings.. May his soul rest in peace

- Lt Col Emmanuel Kwasi Kotoka is another icon of the town. On 24 February 1966 he led the overthrow of the Kwame Nkrumah's government of the Conventions Peoples Party (CPP).
- Bomiklo an influential, wealthy slave trader of Anlo in 1850.

The dancehall artist Setekle Etse Livingstone popularly known as Stonebwoy is also from Alakple

== Religion ==
The African traditional religion is very strong in this town. Most of the homes have shrines housing small gods which the people worship. The Catholic faith was the first Christian denomination in the town. The St Joseph Catholic church was established in 1930 by the Portuguese missionaries. Other churches have since followed.

== Tourist attractions ==
Located in the Kome area, the place is part of the Keta Lagoon Ramsar site. There are many ferns and lichens which are of great significance to the ecology of the area. The area houses the swampy areas for black fish and crabs. The great Anlo god Togbi Nyigbla is the most outstanding deity among the southern Ewe people of Ghana. Nyigbla is a deity of the skies but it is also a deity of war for the Dzevi clan of Anlo. According to Greene Nyigbla ‘came into eminence during the 17th century when tribal wars were frequent and the people needed a war god to lead them to defeat their enemies

== Population ==
Population growth and emigration are important factors in the area. In 1784 it was reported that the population was 100 people. There is emigration from the town and many of the coastal fishing villages have been worst hit. Alakple also suffers as a result of poverty of the lagoon waters surrounding it The natives migrate to Accra, Kumasi, Cape Coast and Sekondi-Takoradi. Others have traveled outside the country for fishing expeditions. Currently population is estimated at 530 to 600 inhabitants.

Reading List

- Dr. A. Kobla Dotse (2011), The Origins and Brief History of the Ewe People
- Rob Van Ginkel Ed (1989), MAST Maritime Anthropological Studies 'The Anlo Ewe and full-time marine fishing another view by G. K. Nukunya'.
- Senyo Adjibolosoo (2012)Journal of Gleanings from Academic Outliers Vol 1, No 1. . ' The foundation of principled centered intellectual community: searching for solutions by Senyo Adzibolosoo'
