= Emmanuel Kwasi Kotoka =

Ghanaian politician

- Born: 26 October 1926; Alakple, Gold Coast (now Ghana)
- Died: 17 April 1967 (aged 40); Accra, Ghana
- Military career
- Allegiance: Ghana
- Branch: Ghana Army
- Service years: 1947–1967
- Rank: Major General
- Commands: Chief of Defence Staff and General Officer Commanding
- Awards: Ghana Service Order for Exceptional Bravery
- Other work: Member of NLC; Minister for Defence; Minister for Health

Lieutenant General Emmanuel Kwasi Kotoka (26 October 1926 – 17 April 1967) was a Ghanaian military officer who was a member of the ruling National Liberation Council which came to power in Ghana in a military coup d'état on 24 February 1966. This overthrew the government of Dr. Kwame Nkrumah, the first president of the republic.

== Early life and education ==
Emmanuel Kotoka was born at Alakple, a village in the Keta district of the Volta Region of the Gold Coast (British colony). He completed his basic education at the Alakple Roman Catholic School and later attended the Anloga Senior School in 1941. He started training as a goldsmith but switched to a career in the military. Kotoka was enlisted as a private in the infantry school of the Gold Coast Regiment.

== Military career ==
In July 1947, he enlisted in the infantry school of the Gold Coast Regiment at Teshie in Accra. He rose through the ranks, becoming a sergeant in 1948, and later Company Sergeant Major in 1951. In 1952, he was among some west African soldiers selected for training at Eaton Hall Officer Cadet School in the United Kingdom. In 1954, he was commissioned as a lieutenant and seconded to the British Army of the Rhine.

On his return to the (Gold Coast) (as Ghana was then called), he was made a platoon commander of the Second Gold Coast Regiment of Infantry. He rose to become the second-in-command, and in 1959, became the platoon commander with the rank of Captain. He was promoted to the rank of Major later that year.

In 1960, he attended the company commander's course at the School of Infantry in Warminster, England. In 1960, he was the commander of D company of the detachment of the Second Battalion of the Ghana Army which made up Ghana's contingent in the United Nations Operation in the Congo deployed in the capital, Leopoldville, now Kinshasa in the Democratic Republic of Congo.

He was regarded as a national hero following this deployment. He was awarded the Ghana Service Order for Exceptional Bravery for Distinguished Service in the Congo in 1963. He later became the Commander of the Second Infantry Brigade (now the Central Command) of the Ghana Army) located at Kumasi.

== Politics ==
In 1965, the then Lieutenant-Colonel Kotoka was transferred to Kumasi where he met and became friends with then Major Akwasi Amankwa Afrifa, an officer in the Second Brigade of the Ghana Army. The two are generally credited with being among the key conspirators behind the first bloody coup d'état in Ghana on 24 February 1966 which brought an end to the first republic of Ghana. They codenamed it "Operation Cold Chop". It was Kotoka who announced the coup to the nation early that morning from the Broadcasting House of the Ghana Broadcasting Corporation, the official radio station in Ghana. The Central Intelligence Agency appears to have been aware about the plotting of the coup at least a year ahead. On the day of the coup in 1966, Kotoka was promoted to Major General and became a member of the ruling National Liberation Council and also the Commissioner for Ministry of Health as well as General Officer Commanding the Ghana Armed Forces. On the first anniversary of the coup, February 24, 1967, he was promoted to the rank of Lieutenant General.

== Death ==
On 17 April 1967, a company of the reconnaissance regiment of the Ghana Army, based at HO, in the Volta Region, attempted to overthrow the NLC government. The operation was code-named "Guitar-boy". Lt. Yeboah and men under his command succeeded in breaking through the defenses of the army headquarters at Flagstaff House and capturing Lt.-Gen. Kotoka. During his court-martial, Lt. Yeboah admitted to stabbing and shooting Kotoka to death.

Kotoka was the general officer commanding the Ghana armed forces, making him the substantive commander of the Second Infantry Brigade, at the time of his death.

Lt. Moses Yeboah and Lt. Sam Arthur were later tried and sentenced to death by a military tribunal. They were publicly executed at the military firing range at Teshie, Accra.

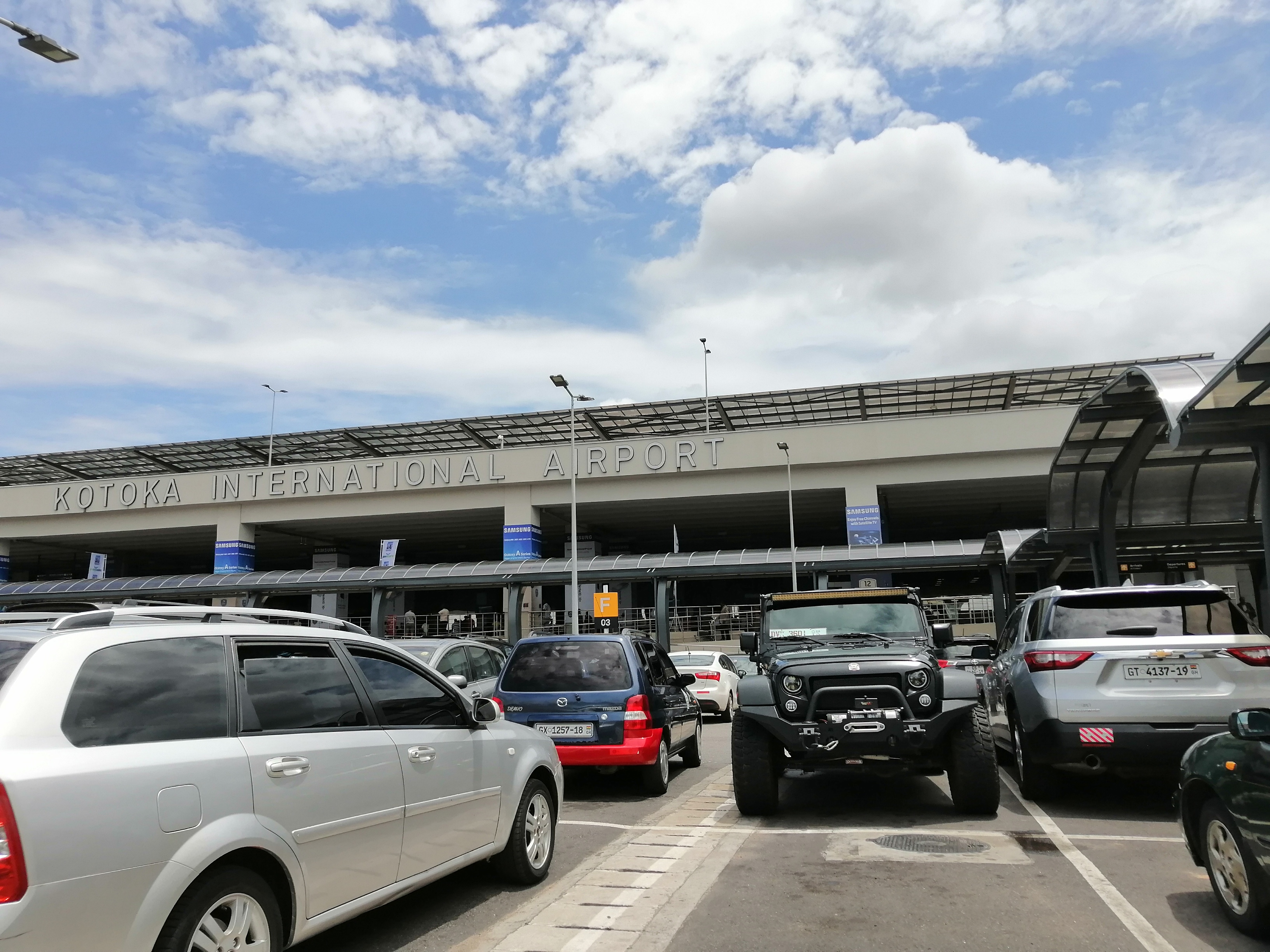
Accra International Airport T3

== Memorial ==
The Ghana International Airport was renamed Kotoka International Airport in his memory. He was killed at a spot which is now part of the forecourt of the airport and his statue used to stand at that spot, but has since been removed to make way for airport expansion projects.

== Personal life ==
He was married to Mad. Monica Kotoka

== Tribute ==
The Irish poet, Máire Mhac an tSaoi, wrote a poem in his memory - "Sea never dry" published in 1968 in the magazine Comhair and subsequently in a collection called "Codladh an Ghaiscigh" published by Sairséal & Dill (Dublin) in 1973. She also included in a recording by Claddagh Records (Ómós do Scoil Dhún Chaoin) in 1970..

''"É d'éag d'fhág trom mo chroise,

An saighdiúir gorm,

I bhfad ó fhód a shínte,

An Saighdiúir gorm...."

Military offices
Preceded by Major General Nathan Aferi	Chief of Defence Staff; 1966–1967	Succeeded by Lt. General Joseph A. Ankrah
Political offices
Preceded by ?	Minister for Health; 1966–1967	Succeeded by ?
Preceded by Kofi Baako	Minister for Defence; 1966–1967	Succeeded by Lt. Gen. J. A. Ankrah
