= Operation Guitar Boy =

Failed coup d'état in Ghana in 1967

Date	17 April 1967
Location	Ghana
Result	Coup failure, leaders punished

Belligerents
Coup plotters	(Ghana) National Liberation Council

Commanders and leaders
Lt. Samuel Arthur (executed); Lt. Moses Yeboah (executed); 2nd Lt. Osei-Poku	Lt. Gen. Emmanuel Kwasi Kotoka †

Strength
119	

Casualties and losses
2 executed	2 killed

Operation Guitar Boy was the code-name for an attempted coup d'état on 17 April 1967 in Ghana, by a group of junior officers of the Ghana Armed Forces. Although unsuccessful, the coup resulted in the assassination of Lieutenant General Emmanuel Kwasi Kotoka, Ghana's Chief of the Defence Staff.

== Background ==
On 24 February 1966, a military coup took place, with the military of Ghana overthrowing the Convention People's Party (CPP) government of the Republic of Ghana's first President, Kwame Nkrumah. The ruling military government dubbed itself the National Liberation Council (NLC), and Kotoka, as General Officer Commanding the Ghana Armed Forces, was a key figure in the Council.

== Guitar Boy ==
The attempted counter-coup against the NLC was instigated by three junior officers of the Ghana Armed Forces: Lt. Samuel Arthur, Lt. Moses Yeboah and 2nd Lt. Osei-Poku. With the support of several senior officers, including Warrant Officer George Ofosu, and 119 soldiers of the 2nd Recce (Reconnaissance) Regiment, the coup-makers plotted to overthrow the NLC government.

The operation was named "Guitar Boy", after a popular song by Nigerian musician Victor Uwaifo, in which the West African water goddess, the Mami Wata, had given him a guitar and asked him to make good music. After the attempted coup, "Guitar Boy" was banned by the NLC from radio airplay in Ghana.

Lt. Gen. Kotoka was shot and killed by Lt. Yeboah at Ghana International Airport. The airport was later renamed Accra International Airport in honour of the General, and the spot on which he was killed now houses a life-size memorial statue.

Lt. Arthur attempted to gain access to the ammunition depot of the 1st Recce Regiment. In a struggle for the keys, Captain Avevor – the depot's quartermaster – was shot and killed. Another junior officer, Captain Borkloe and Staff Sgt Osei Grunshie (the Batman for Gen. Kotoka) also lost their lives in the abortive coup.

For their role in the deaths, Yeboah and Arthur were executed by firing squad while Osei-Poku received a thirty-year prison sentence.

== Aftermath ==
Although the Guitar Boy coup was ultimately unsuccessful, it was considered that it had led to the eventual downfall of the NLC government, due to increasing rifts caused by the assassination of Kotoka who had been a stabilising influence in the military government.

Some Nkrumaists claimed that Arthur's abortive coup was aimed at restoring the deposed President Kwame Nkrumah and his Convention People's Party. However, Ofosu-Appiah's biography of Kotoka indicates something different, for Arthur was reported to have said that he wanted to be the first subaltern to have staged a successful military coup in Africa.
