= Anyanui =

- Village
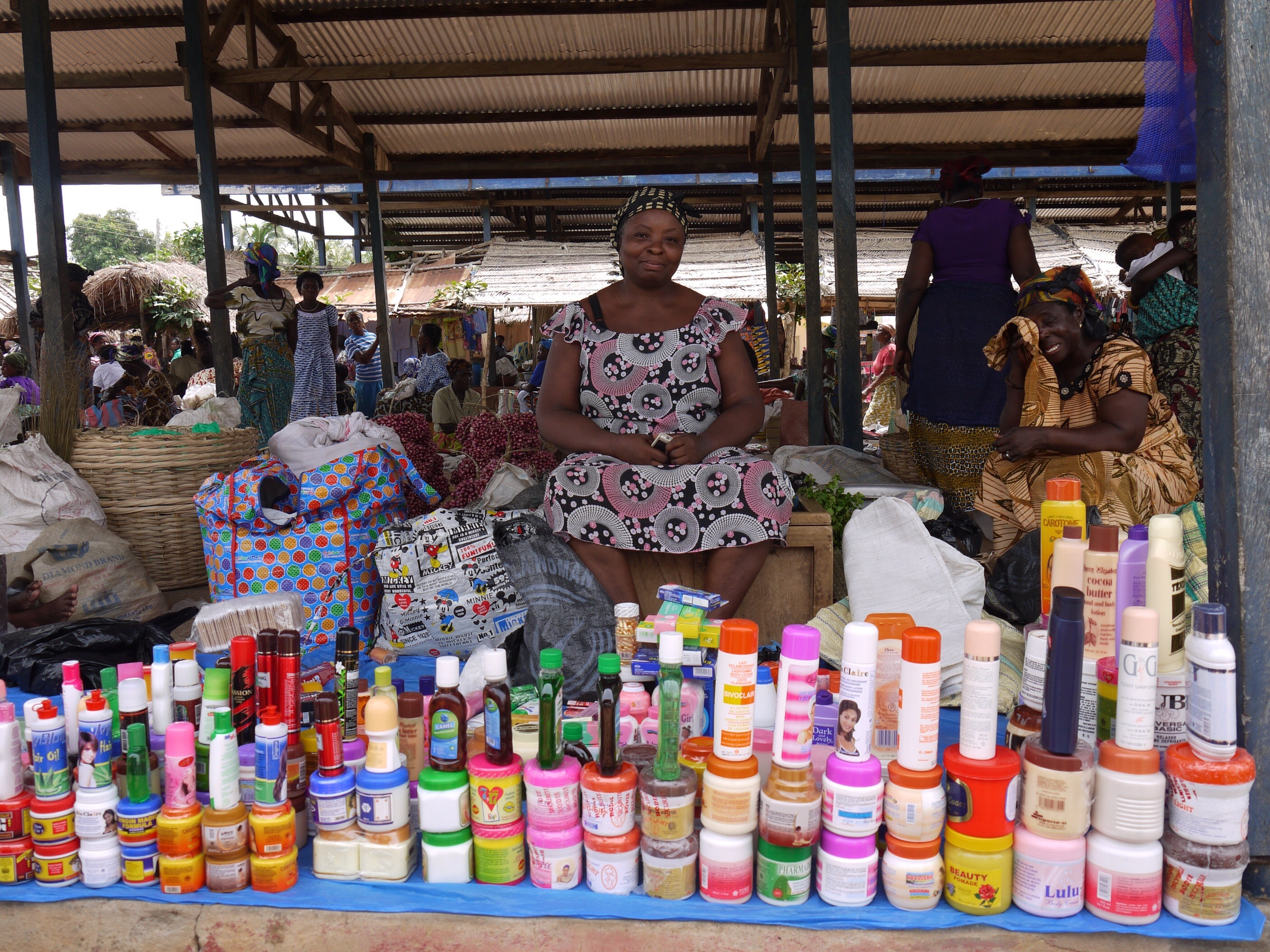
- Market in Anaynui, 2012

- Location in Ghana
- Coordinates: 5°47′0″N 0°44′0″E
- Country: Ghana
- Region: Volta Region
- District: Keta Municipal District

Population
  - Ethnicities: Ewe people
- Time zone: GMT
  - Summer (DST): GMT

Anyanui is a village in Keta Municipal District, Ghana.

Anyanui is connected to Ada Foah by a ferry which runs every Wednesday, calling at a number of other villages on the way.

Anyanui is subject to coastal erosion and a $60 million project has been initiated to cover the 2.7 kilometres between Anyanui and Akplortorkor.
