= Anlo Afiadenyigba =

Anlo Afiadenyigba (Adzigo)
- Location in Ghana
- Coordinates: 6°1′27.04″N 0°59′0.79″E
- Country: Ghana
- Region: Volta Region
- District: Keta Municipal District
- Time zone: GMT
  - Summer (DST): GMT

Anlo Afiadenyigba is a town in the Volta Region of Ghana. The town is located on the eastern part of the Keta Lagoon.

The people of Anlo Afiadenyigba are descendants of the Anlo Ewe groups who settled in Anloga. The Anlo ancestors migrated from Notsie in Central Togo in mid – seventeenth century. They established several small settlements on the southern, western and northern shores of the Keta Lagoon. These include Tegbi, Alakple and Kodzi in the south, Anyako to the west and Afiadenyigba on the northern part. Royal Houses recognized within Anlo Afiadenyigba Traditional Area as at 2024 and their locations/Residence in the Traditional Area: 1. Fiaga Kadzahlo Drabese, The Paramount Chief of Anlo Afiadenyigba Traditional Area 2. Fia Salu - Fiagbaga/(Salukorfe) 3. Fia Avuworda - DomeKpornuga 4. Fia Akamu - Agbonuga 5. Fia Saba - Alagbati 6. Fia Axorlu - Ablame 7. Fia Tete-Dziekpor - Ablame 8. Fia Aglebe - DomeKpornuga 9. Fia Ekpey-Subo - DomeKpornuga 10. Fia Kwakutsey Boafo - Dziehe 11. Dzakpasu - Dzakpasukorpe 12. Fia Emesse - Tsavanya 13. Fialor - Dziehe 14. Kokotsi - Dziehe 15. Yorxor - Ablame 16. Dorkenu - Ablame 17. Kordjodey - Alagbati 18. Nyadi Alorde Kamasa - Tengekorfe 19. Soga - Ablame.

Some Divisions/Locations yet to be identified with royal houses: Nyravase and Avake-Kpota

== Occupation ==
Most of the inhabitants are fisher folk who fish in the Keta Lagoon. The women trade in fried fish between Ghana and Togo. There is a salt mining when the northern part of the lagoon dies up. Some of the men are kente weavers who sell their work in Agbozume market. Production of coconut oil is common in the area which has a large coconut plantation.

== Music ==
Afiadenyigba has been noted for learning and performing many music dances. Fishermen who traveled out to Benin, Togo or Nigeria learnt many dances which they brought to the town. They go to other towns to teach such drums as Gahu Dance, Gadzo, Atsiagbekor and others.

A music and dance group found in the area is the Gadzo Group founded by the late Mortoo Agbovor in 1939, named after war dance and drum rhythm performed by the community's forefathers as they migrated into Southeastern Ghana.

== Education ==
The town has the Anlo Afiadenyigba Secondary School. The school is a second cycle institution.

There are four basic schools in Anlo Afiadenyigba which has a population of 6740.

Name of school	Year established	Type
Evangelical Presbyterian Basic School	1903	Public School
Roman Catholic Basic School	1926	Public School
Dunenyo Basic School	1980	Private School
Agorsco Basic School	2004	Private School

== Chiefs of Anlo Afiadenyigba Traditional Area ==
There are more than ten chiefs in the Anlo Afiadenyigba Traditional Area. These are as follows.

Division/Residence	Name of Chief	Designation
Anlo Afiadenyigba Traditional Area. (Resides in Ablorme)	Fiaga Kadzahlo Drabese	Dufia (Fiaga) The Paramount Chief
Dziehe	Fia Kwakutse Boafo	Fomefia/Tokormefia
Lagbati	Fia Saba	Fomefia/Tokormefia
Ablorme	Fia Tete-Dziekpor and Fia Ahorlu	Fomefiawo/Tokormefiawo
Dome-Kpornuga	Fia Ekpe Subo, Fia Avuworda and Fia Aglebe	Fomefiawo/Tokormefiawo
Agbonuga	Fia Akamu	Fomefia/Tokormefia
Afiadenyigbaga/(Salukorfe)	Fia Salu	Fomefia/Tokormefia
Nyravase	Tomegawo	Tomegawo
Tengekorfe	Tomegawo	Tomegawo
Tsavanya	Fia Emesse	Tokormefia
Kpordoave	Fia Agzikpete, Fia K. Tameklo	Fomefiawo/Tokormefiawo
Avakekpota	Tomegawo	Tomegawo
Dzakpasukorfe	Fia Dzakpasu	Fomefia/Dzakpasukorfefia

== Local Government Representation ==
The town has three assembly members which represent the town at the Keta Municipal Assembly. These are as follows

Name of Assembly Member	Area of Jurisdiction
Hon Gilbert Keklie	Dziehe, Kpornuga, Ablorme,
Hon Amos Kwesi Ametsimey	Agbonuga and Afiadenyigbaga
Hon Jacob Onipayede	Nyravase and Tengekope
