= Keta Municipal District =

Municipal District in Volta Region, Ghana

- Municipal District
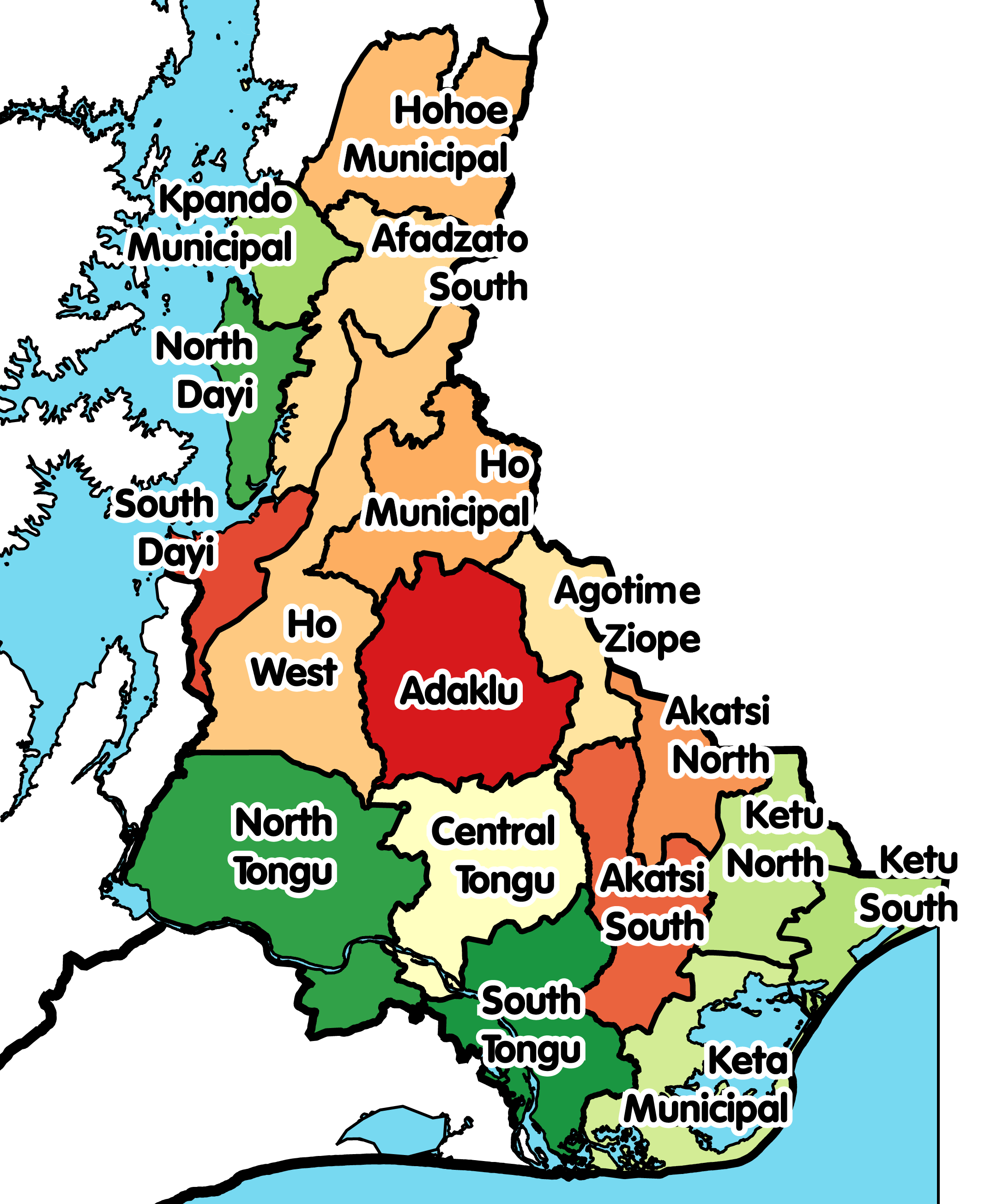
- Districts of Volta Region

- Location of Keta Municipal District within Volta
- Coordinates: 5°54′11.16″N 0°59′12.48″E
- Country: Ghana
- Region: Volta
- Capital: Keta

Government
  - Municipal Chief Executive: Hon. Sylvester Tornyeava

Area
  - Total: 182 km^{2} (70 sq mi)

Population (2021)
  - Total: 78,862
  - Density: 433/km^{2} (1,120/sq mi)
- Time zone: UTC+0 (GMT)
- ISO 3166 code: GH-TV-KA

Keta Municipal District is one of the eighteen districts in Volta Region, Ghana. Originally created as an ordinary district assembly in 1988 when it was known as Keta District, which was created from the former Anlo District Council, until it was elevated to municipal district assembly status on 1 November 2007 (effectively 29 February 2008) to become Keta Municipal District. However on 19 February 2019, the western part of the district was split off to create Anloga District; thus the remaining part has been retained as Keta Municipal District. The municipality is located in the southeast part of Volta Region and has Keta as its capital town.

== Boundaries ==
Keta Municipal District is bounded by:

- the Gulf of Guinea to the east and south,
- River Volta and South Tongu District to the west,
- Akatsi District to the north and northwest, and
- Ketu South Municipal District to the northeast.

== Villages ==
In addition to Keta, the capital and administrative centre, Anloga (Angloga), Anyako and Abor are the only towns, Keta Municipal District contains the following villages:

- Abonokofe (village)
- Abor (town)
- Agbatsivi (village)
- Agobledokui (village)
- Agortoe (village)
- Agovinu (village)
- Akplorlortorkor (village)
- Anlo Afiadenyigba (village)
- Anloga (town)
- Anyako (town)
- Anyanui (village)
- Asadame (village)
- Atiavi (village)
- Atiteti / Antititi (village)
- Atito / Achito (village)
- Atorkor (village)
- Bomigo (village)
- Bleamezado (village)
- Dzelukope (village)
- Dzita (village)
- Dzita-Agbledomi (village)
- Fuveme (village)
- Galo-Sota (village)
- Gbetuinu (village)
- Hatorgodo (village)
- Horvi(village)
- Kedzi (village)
- Salo (village)
- Sasieme (village)
- Seva, Ghana|Seva (village)
- Srogbe (village)
- Tegbi (village)
- Trekume (village)
- Tregui (village)
- Tsiame (village)
- Tunu (village)
- Vodza (village)
- Weme (village)
- Woe (village)
- Wuti (village)
- Heluvi (Village)

== Geography ==
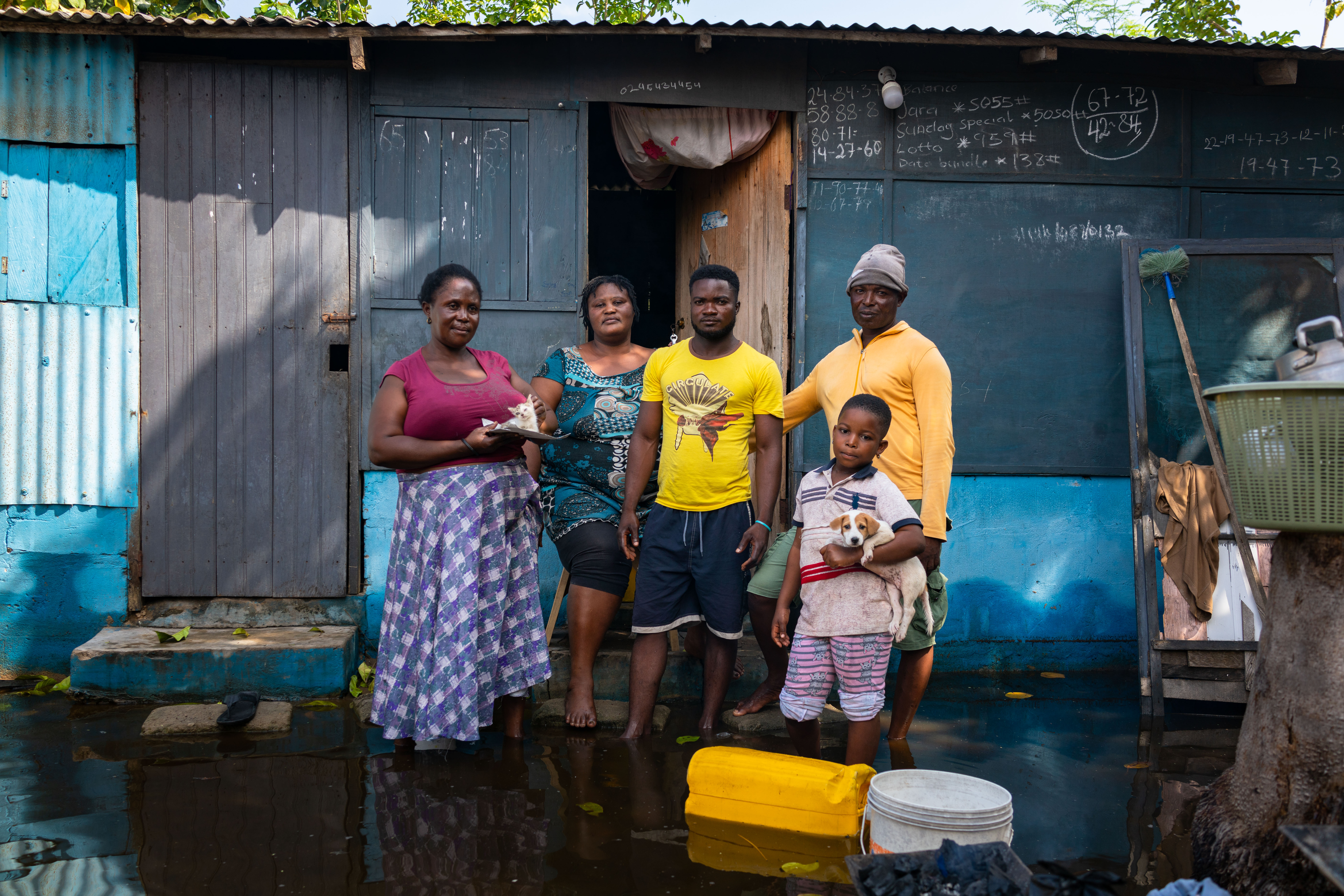
Because of sea level rise caused by climate change, low lying communities in Keta Municipality are vulnerable to sunny day flooding.

=== Climate ===
Tropical savanna climates have monthly mean temperature above 18 °C (64 °F) in every month of the year and typically a pronounced dry season, with the driest month having precipitation less than 60mm (2.36 in) of precipitation. The Köppen Climate Classification subtype for this climate is "Aw". (Tropical Savanna Climate).

Climate data for Keta Municipal District
Month	Jan	Feb	Mar	Apr	May	Jun	Jul	Aug	Sep	Oct	Nov	Dec	Year
Mean daily maximum °C (°F)	30 (86)	31 (87)	31 (88)	31 (87)	30 (86)	29 (84)	27 (81)	27 (81)	28 (83)	29 (85)	31 (88)	31 (87)	29 (85)
Mean daily minimum °C (°F)	28 (82)	29 (84)	29 (84)	29 (84)	28 (82)	27 (81)	26 (78)	25 (77)	26 (79)	27 (80)	28 (82)	28 (82)	27 (81)
Average precipitation days	0	0	2	3	4	6	3	2	5	4	1	1	31
Source: Weatherbase

== Sources ==
- "Districts of Ghana". Statoids.
- Keta Municipal District on GhanaDistricts.com
