= Keta Lagoon =

Lagoon in Volta Region, Ghana

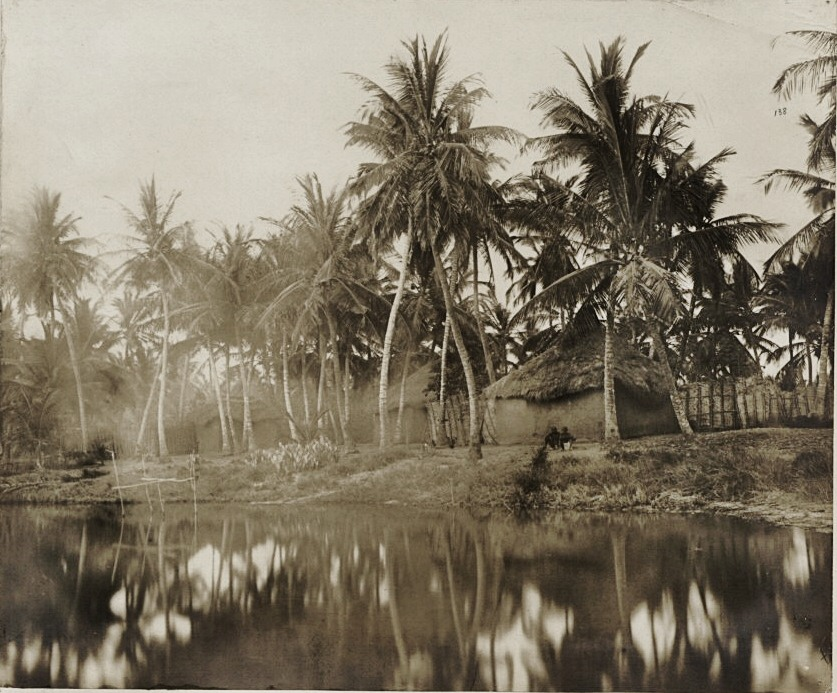
- Village on the Keta Lagoon, 1890s

- Location within Ghana
- Location: Volta Region
- Nearest city: Keta
- Coordinates: 5.8879°N 0.8267°E
- Area: 1,200 km^{2} (460 sq mi)

Ramsar Wetland
- Official name: Keta Lagoon Complex Ramsar Site
- Designated: 14 August 1992
- Reference no.: 567

Keta Lagoon, also called Anlo-Keta lagoon, is the largest of the over 90 lagoons that cover the 550 km stretch of the coastline of Ghana. This lagoon is 126.13 km in length. It is located in the eastern coast of Ghana and separated from the Gulf of Guinea by a narrow strip of sandbar. This open salty water is surrounded by flood plains and mangrove swamps. Together they form the Keta Lagoon Ramsar site which covers 1200 km^{2}

There are seasonal inflow of sea water during high tide from the Gulf of Guinea and regular inflow of rivers. The rivers which drain into the lagoon include the Aka, the Tordzi River and Belikpa stream which enter the lagoon from the north. The lagoon is surrounded by many settlements. The towns include Anloga, Woe, Keta and Kedzi to the south, Aborlove Nolopi, Anyako and Anlo Afiadenyigba to the north, Kodzi, Alakple and Tregui to the west and Denu and Adina to the east.

Over the years population growth, extensive human activities and climate change all contributed to reduce the volume of water in the lagoon which appears to be drying up. The lagoon became part of the daily existence of the people of Anlo land. In 1992 the Keta Lagoon was placed on the list of Wetlands of International Importance by the Ramsar Convention on Wetlands, and in 1999 work began on measures to limit further erosion and to control flooding of the coastal region.

== Prominence ==
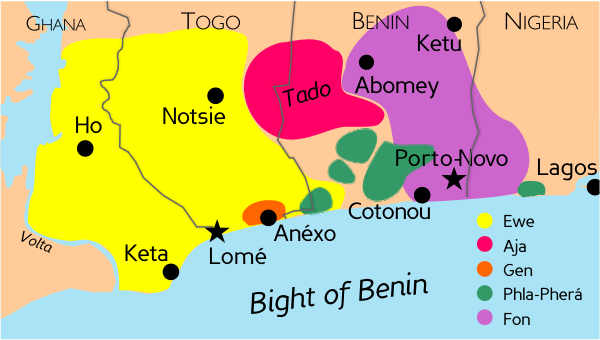
Keta Lagoon is in the south-western end of the region settled by the Ewe people

This Lagoon got its name and prominence from the settlement of Anlo- Ewes but more especially from the town Keta and the uses to which this water resource is put. The inhabitants of the area surrounding the lagoon are the descendants of the Anlo Ewe groups who settled in Anlo land. Their ancestors migrated from Notsie in central Togo in the mid –seventeenth century. They settled at Anloga and then established several small settlements around the shores of the Keta Lagoon. Some of these towns are shown below with their 2010 populations.

Name of Town	2010 Population figure
Keta	8,101
Anloga	29,748
Anyako	6,780
Anlo Afiadenyigba	9,680
Tegbi	10,056
Kedzi	129
Kodzi	185
Asadame	1,410
Woe	558
Tregui	786
Wuti	2,340
Atiteti	978
Dzato	879
Yenui	667
Alakple	529
Srogboe	640
Dzita	3531
Blekusu	897
Adina	758
Anyanui	1,783
Havedzi	897
Vodza	769
Dzelukope	10,409
Total	92,510

=== Geography ===
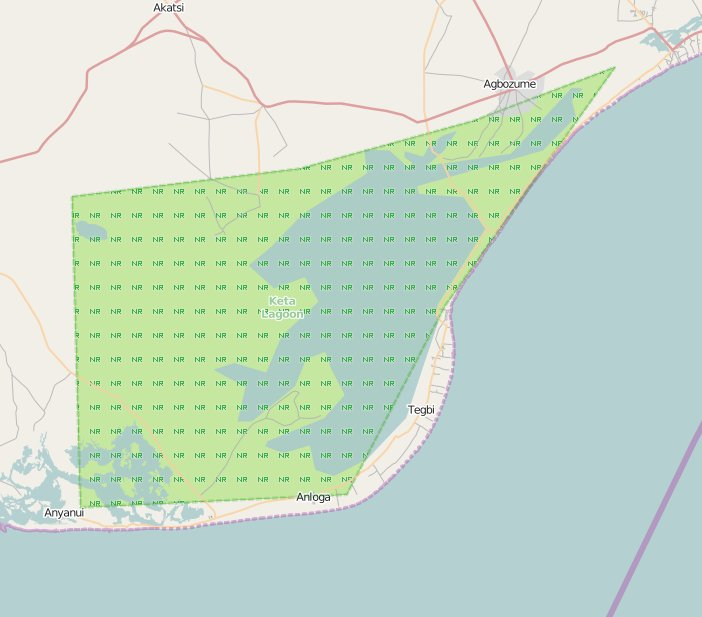
Map of Keta Lagoon from OpenStreetMap

The topography of the area is a flat land with extensive lagoons in Togo and Benin along the coast. This suggests that the lagoon might have been formed when the sea receded back over the millennia. Hence there is a sandy coastline or sandy deposition along the littoral. Another theory is that there could be coastal rivers which have dried up leaving behind large ponds. This is evidenced by the remains of oyster shells that are deposited at various spots in towns to the northern side of the lagoon. A third theory is that during the ice age these spots were the remains of the ice which melted due to rise in temperature leaving behind a fresh lagoon. The infiltration of sea water made it saline.

=== Climate ===
The Köppen Climate Classification is "Aw". (Tropical Savanna Climate).

Climate data for Keta Municipal District
Month	Jan	Feb	Mar	Apr	May	Jun	Jul	Aug	Sep	Oct	Nov	Dec	Year
Mean daily maximum °C (°F)	30 (86)	31 (87)	31 (88)	31 (87)	30 (86)	29 (84)	27 (81)	27 (81)	28 (83)	29 (85)	31 (88)	31 (87)	29 (85)
Mean daily minimum °C (°F)	28 (82)	29 (84)	29 (84)	29 (84)	28 (82)	27 (81)	26 (78)	25 (77)	26 (79)	27 (80)	28 (82)	28 (82)	27 (81)
Average precipitation days	0	0	2	3	4	6	3	2	5	4	1	1	31
Source: Weatherbase

=== Islands ===
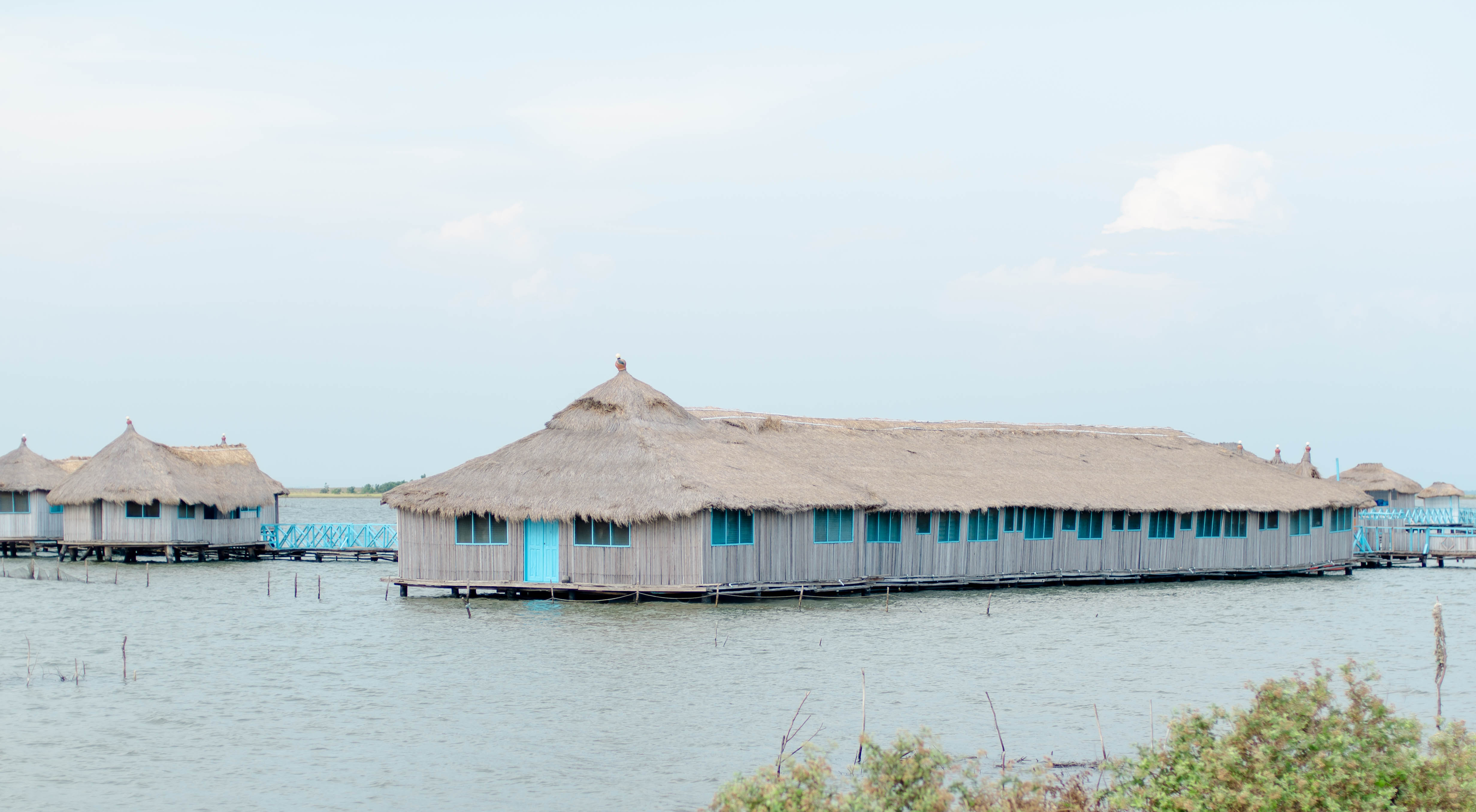
Keta Lagoon-1

Seva is an island located in the Keta Lagoon. By 2010, it has a population of 300 people with a terrain elevation of 43 metres above sea level. It has social amenities such as the School run by the African Methodist Episcopal Zion Church. Portable water is available. It is linked to the mainland by a road to Konu. Other islands include Dudu with no human habitation and Netivi Kpota where there are coconut trees.

=== Problem of flooding ===
There is constant flooding of the area after heavy rains and also from the inflow of Kplikpa and Aka rivers into the lagoon. The colonial government began to record the high water levels at Keta from 1907 onwards, but for a long time they did not do much because they claimed that the merchants and inhabitants should also invest in saving their own town and businesses. The foreign merchants and people of Keta believed that the colonial government should be responsible in saving the land. This issue has defined the political history of the Anlo - Ewe politicians. In periods of flooding, entire settlements would move out of their homes. To stop the flooding and the coastal erosion attempts were made during the colonial period without success. In 1963, Aryee, an officer in charge of the Public Works Department at the Keta District took the initiative and cut a canal from the lagoon to the sea. This was known as Aryee Canal. He and the ground on which he was standing was swept away by a huge flood and it turned out that his plan had done more harm than good. The problem of flooding has now abated because of increased climate change and reduction in rainfall. The Keta Sea Defence project has created a canal between the lagoon and the sea so that over flooded water can go through the canal into the sea. A road was constructed through the lagoon from Kedzi to Metsrikasa for the transportation of the boulder rocks used for the construction work. Since there is no bridge for the water to flow through, the road created shallow waters to the eastern part of the lagoon.

=== Economic role ===
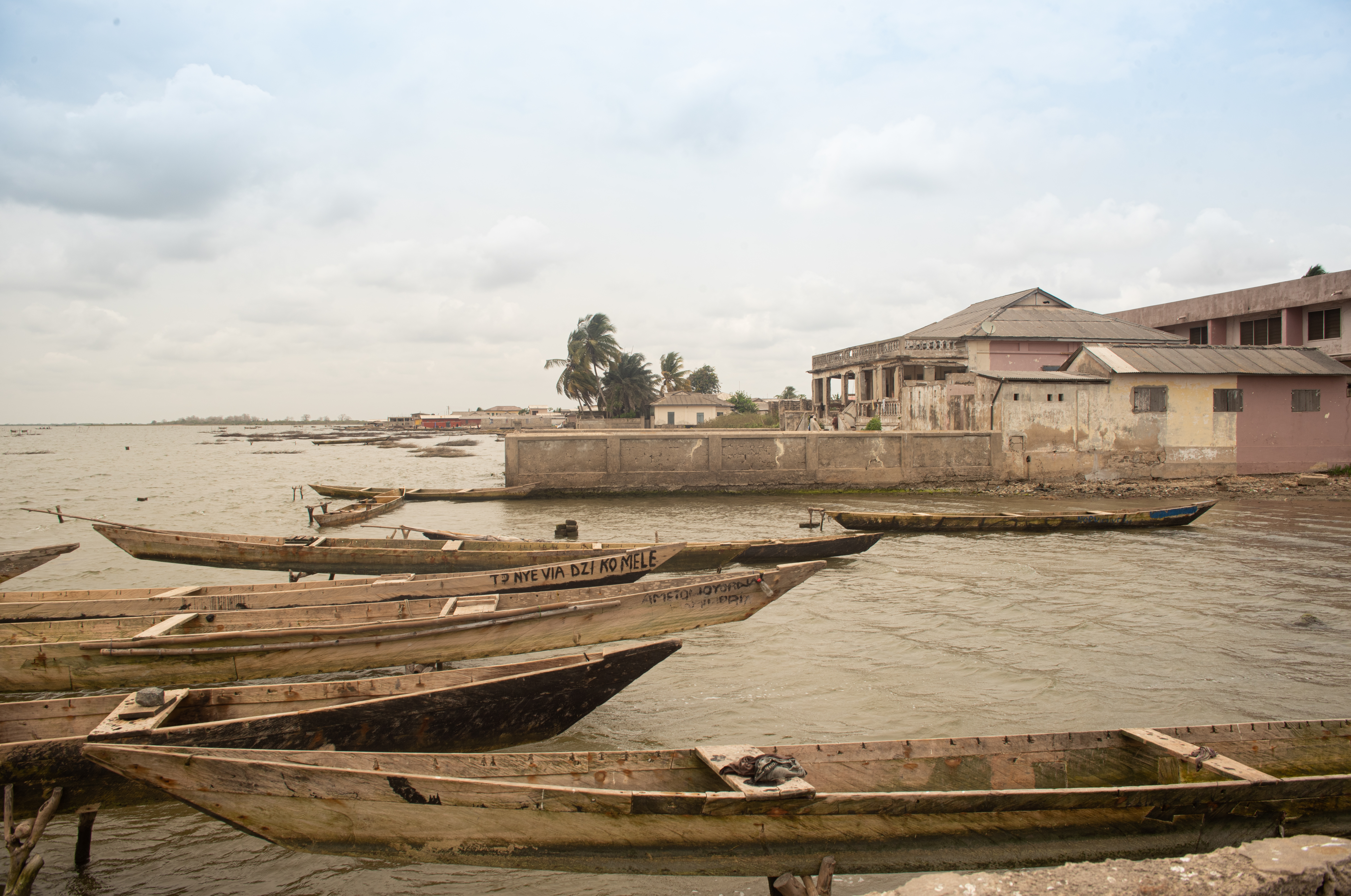
Pirogues in Anyako

The lagoon and its Ramsar site contribute significantly to the economic well-being of the people. They provide the livelihood through fishing and boat transportation from Keta to Anyako and Afiadenyigba. Salt winning is common in years when there is low rainfall. Coconut trees abound close to the coastal areas from which coconut oil is extracted. An opportunity also exists for turning aquatic reeds harvested by women into bags, mats and other handicrafts that will provide alternative livelihoods to generate income especially for women.

=== Spiritual significance ===
The practitioners of the traditional Anlo belief system have a strong spiritual attachment to the lagoon. It is believed that the lagoon has gods who must be worshiped if the people wish to get abundant catch. One of the gods is called ‘Gbele’ where the people of Anlo Afiadenyigba once every year perform some rituals for the lagoon. At times a live cow is deposited in the lagoon so that there could be a bumper harvest. The Bate Clan assert their relationship with Mama Bate, a sea Orisha, and claim responsibility for the expansion of the land around Keta as arising from this relationship with her.

On many occasions children get drowned while swimming and people got missing during fishing expeditions and most of these accidents are attributed to spiritual forces.

In 1983, the leader of the Apostolic Revelation Society the late Apostle C.N.K Wovenu was invited to pray for increase in the waters of the lagoon since the lagoon was almost dried up because of the dry weather that year. After the prayers, fishermen were instructed not to fish on Sundays in the lagoon.

Gradually there is a reduction in the importance of spiritual significance of the lagoon. The diminished importance in the spiritual significance of the lagoon and other water bodies in Anlo which Green (2002) described could be explained by the decline in fish stocks caught from the lagoon.

Although some fishermen attribute declining catches to social-spiritual causes such as conflict in the community or as punishment from the gods, more fishermen are aware of the increased fishing effort as a cause for declining catches. Some of these fishermen are migrating to other parts of the country and outside Ghana to continue with fishing.

=== Biodiversity conservation ===
The lagoon is important in conserving several species of mangroves, crabs, shrimps and raffia plants.

== Types of fish ==
This lagoon holds a variety of fishes from the marine environment and from rivers. It is a spawning zone for fingerlings and habitat is conducive for native fishes. With seasonal inflow of sea water, marine fishes migrate to breed in the calmer waters of the lagoon, especially the safe haven provided by the mangrove swamp section.

=== Freshwater fisheries ===
The endemic fishes in the lagoons are mostly cichlids. Sarotherodon melanotheron is the dominant fish with Tilapia guineensis, l'zillii and Hemichromis fasciatus also found in the catches. Some of the freshwater species encountered were Oreochromis niloticus, Tilapia zillii, Hemichromis fasciatus and H. bimaculatus.

=== Marine fisheries ===
The common marine species found in the lagoon were the mojarra (Gerres melanopterus), half beak (Hyporhamphus picarti) and the needle fish (Strongylura senegalensis). Juveniles of the flat sardine Sardinella mardrensis, mullets Mugil curema and Liza falcipinnis as well as Caranx hippos were also encountered. In Keta Lagoon, Pellonula leonensis was most abundant. After the Sea Defence Project is finished, the lagoon has regained economic significance. The lagoon was dredged and an open link was created with the ocean to enable shrimps to swim into the lagoon. This protected environment allows valuable shrimp to increase in size quickly.

=== Methods of fishing ===
Drag nets are commonly used in the lagoon. Other fishing gears used are bottles also called 'atukpaxe' which are mostly used by women, hook and line, acadja and traps. Although acadjas act as fish aggregating devices that provide shelter for fish thereby enhancing fish breeding in the lagoon, the use of mangroves and twigs, which are cut from neighboring vegetation, makes this method of fishing environmentally unfriendly. When the lagoon waters are low fish are caught using the hand.

== Birdlife ==
Keta lagoon is the most important wetland on the Ghana coast for waterbirds and together with Songor Lagoon constitutes the fourth most important waterbirds site on the Gulf of Guinea coast. The site supports 76 waterbird species with an estimated total population of well over 100,000, including globally significant numbers of 21 species. The site is particularly important for waders, supporting almost one third of the estimated East Atlantic Flyway population of spotted redshank. Other species which occur in large numbers at the site include curlew sandpiper, little stint, black-winged stilt, white-faced whistling-duck, as well as several heron and egret species. The most important parts of the lagoon for waterbirds are the Fiahor, Woe, Tegbi, Adina and Afiadenyigba sections.

The lagoon is the most important waterbird site along the entire Ghana coast, with a record of 72 species of resident and migratory birds. Keta Lagoon and its surrounding wetlands qualifies as an internationally important wetland under the Ramsar criteria by virtue of its total bird population of around 110,000 and the fact that it supports internationally important eight species of migratory waders. The lagoon has been designated an Important Bird Area (IBA) by BirdLife International because it supports significant populations of non-breeding and wintering waterbirds.

== Salt production ==
There is large salt production in some parts of the lagoon at specific times. Producing salt from the saline waters of the Keta Lagoon were unknown until 1702 because the people did not have the technology to do it. Salt production has gradually developed among the people. During the harmattan season of November to February, the shallower parts of the lagoon close to Adina, Afiadenyigba and Anyako get evaporated especially during years when the rainfall is low. Salt crystal form from the sodium chloride which is available naturally in the area. The men make enclosures around the salty water to stop any fresh water from flowing into it. These crystals grow larger and are then mined or collected mostly by the women. Investors buy the salt and store it for sale when the prices are increased. This natural resource brings a lot of revenue to the people. However, in December 2013, 600 residents from Agbozume, at the eastern end of the lagoon, took part in a protest against the Kensington Salt Factory, who they claimed had endangered their livelihoods by creating a crater to remove sand to build a road. This, they said had damaged the banks of the lagoon and created the threat of flooding. However, the chiefs of Adina contested the validity of the Agbozome protestors, ane explained that they had the authority to grant permission for Kensington Industries Limited to exploit this resource.

== Ecotourism ==
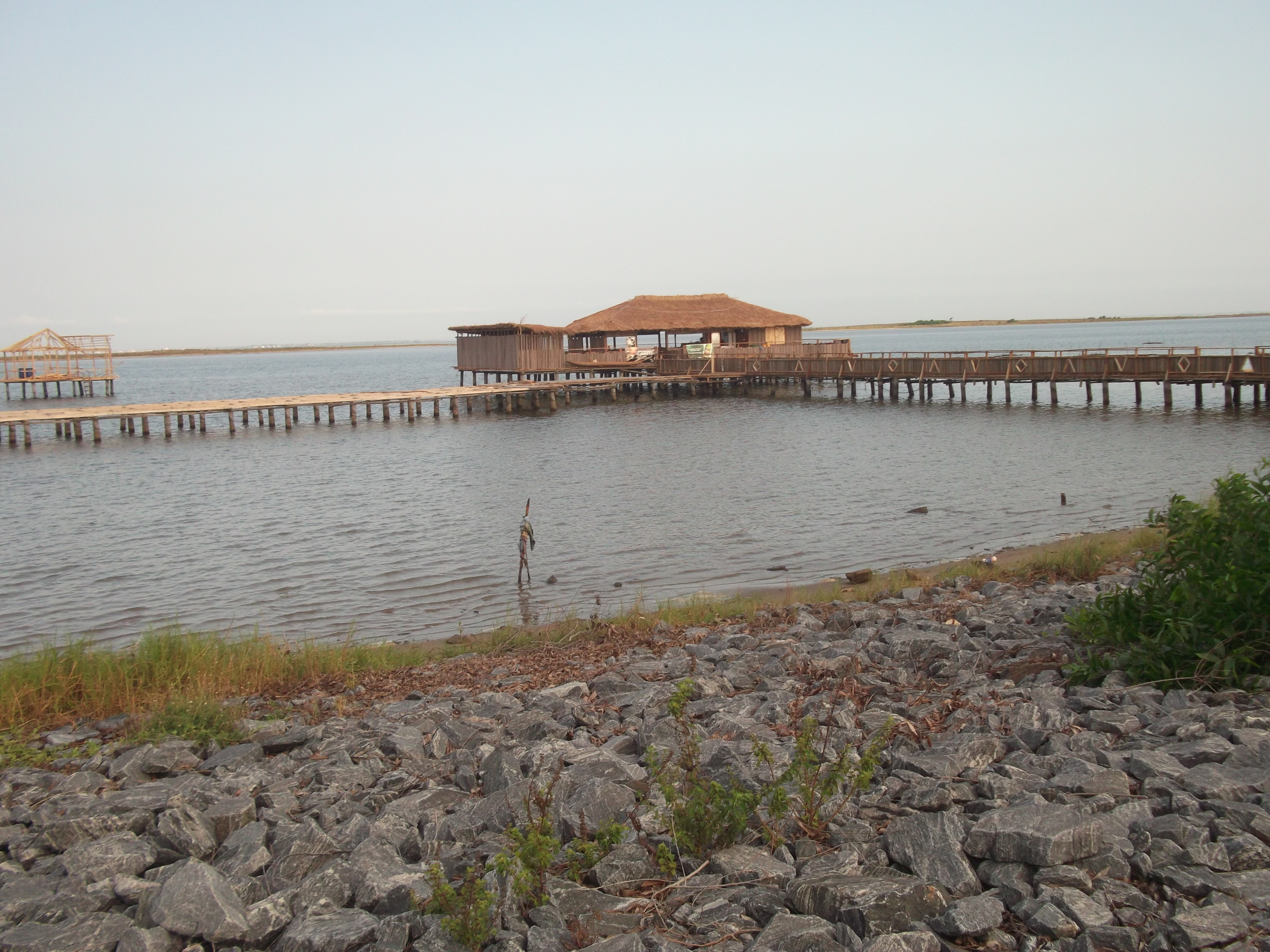
Tourist centers constructed Kedzi in the Keta Lagoon

The Anlo- Keta area also abounds in native culture and tradition that could attract ecotourists. Projects involving private and public partnership could help develop play grounds and picnic areas, lagoon swimming facilities, sailing and fishing, cycling, beach volleyball and jogging as sports to attract local recreational tourism. An opportunity also exists for turning aquatic reeds harvested by women into bags, mats and other handicrafts that will provide alternative livelihoods to generate income especially for women. There are native dances such as agbadza, gahu, atsiagbekor, babasiko and misago. Salt mining is also a special skill of tourist attraction.

== Conflicts of use ==
There are many conflicts arising from the ownership and use of the natural resources of the lagoon. On occasions fishermen from Afiadenyigba used drag nets in fishing the deeper waters near Woe and they were accused of stealing fish from the seine net used by Woe fishermen and this resulted in fights which were arbitrated at the chief's court. On many occasions cutting of mangrove trees for smoking of fish resulted in arguments of ownership.

== Environmental degradation ==
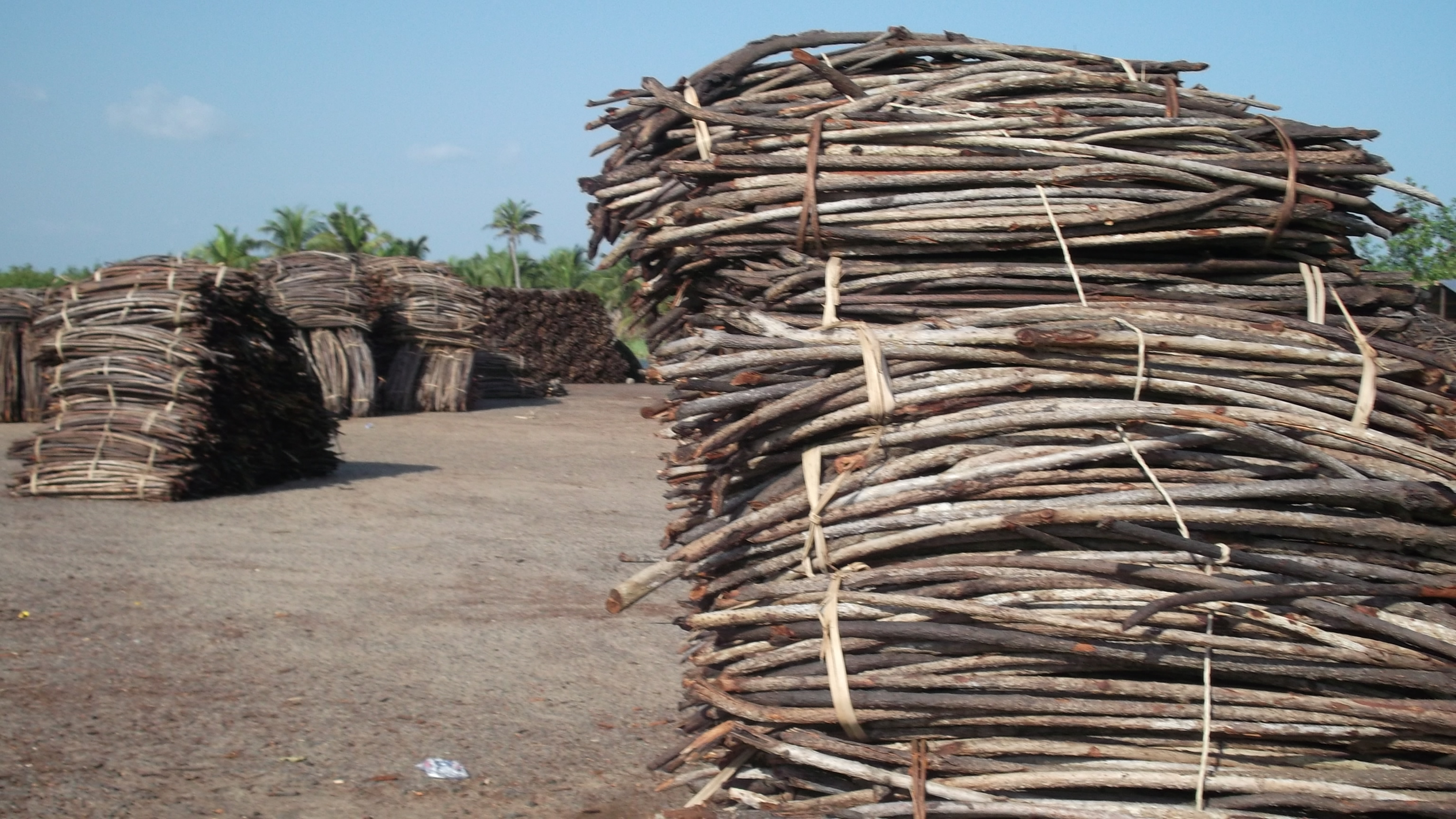
Mangrove trees at Anyanui cut for fuelwood

These fisheries are affected by habitat degradation, pollution by domestic waste and poverty of the fisher folks. Overfishing causes changes in the size and structure of the fishes as well as species composition of the catches.

Most of the red and white mangroves around the lagoons have been cut down for fuelwood or to create salt pans. Thus the spawning, breeding and feeding sites of fishes are being destroyed.

Fisher folks also tend to use smaller mesh nets in fishing as a means to increase their catch. To arrest overfishing, fishing is not permitted on Tuesdays and in other towns fishing is banned on Sundays and before certain festival times. These are all means to reduce overfishing and over exploitation of the fish.

Ex-President Flight Lieutenant Jerry John Rawlings (whose mother came from Dzelukope), has called for the protection of the Keta Lagoon from harmful human activities. He mentioned activities such as disposing of garbage into the lagoon, using dangerous chemicals for fishing and over fishing as very harmful. Flt. Lt. Rawlings was addressing the 2010 Tagbaza (Lagoon Festival) organized by the chiefs and people of Anlo Afiadenyigba . He said if those activities continued, the ability of the Lagoon to sustain the people in the area economically would reduce considerably.
