= Anloga =

Anloga Aŋlɔga
- Town
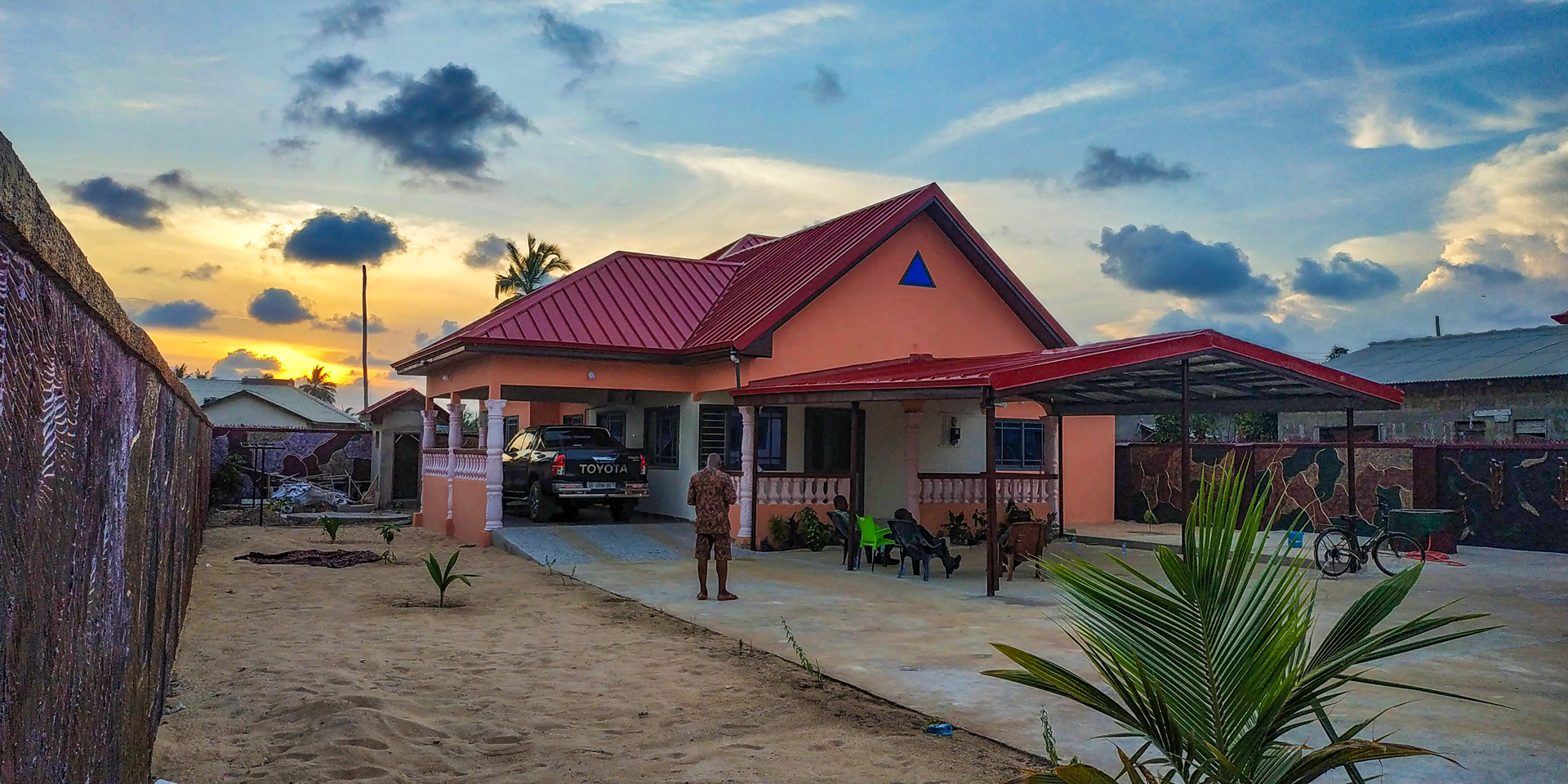
- A house in Anloga, Ghana

- Location in Ghana
- Coordinates: 5°47′31″N 0°54′01″E
- Country: Ghana
- Region: Volta Region
- District: Anloga District Assembly
- Elevation: 3 m (9.8 ft)

Population (2012)
  - Total: 35,933
- Ranked 47th in Ghana
- Time zone: GMT
  - Summer (DST): GMT

Anloga is a town in Anloga District of the Volta Region in southeast Ghana. It lies east of the Volta River and just south of the Keta Lagoon. Anloga is the forty-seventh most populous town in Ghana, in terms of population, with a population of 35,933 people and also serves as the seat of the Awormefia of Anlo State and the traditional, ancestral and spiritual capital of the Anlo Anlo Ewe.

== History ==
Anloga became the traditional and ritual capital of the Anlo Ewe in the seventeenth century after they migrated to the Keta Lagoon area from Notsie in Togo.

Following the Anlo-Danish War also known as Sagbadre War, the Danes built Fort Prinzenstein at Keta in 1784. However their efforts to exert any power beyond the range of the guns located in the fort proved to be ineffective. In June 1790 a Danish official was killed at Agorko near Denu in retaliation for him killing the chief of Keta years earlier. Lacking any effective military forces, the Danes hired the Anloga to punish the Keta. Initially the Anloga and Keta agreed to stage a mock battle after which the Anloga would burn a few Keta houses and then share the money provided by the Danes. But the mock fight somehow turned into a real battle, leaving a legacy of enmity between Anloga and Keta. Keta then moved across the lagoon to build the Somey State with Agbozume as their traditional capital. This substantially weakened the Anlo people. In 1850 Fort Prinzenstein was sold to the British, however it took them another twenty five years to integrate towns like Anloga into their colony which they called the Gold Coast colony

Etymology

Anlo:ga (Ewe language) - Me: nlɔ: - I have shrunk/ my skin has shrunk/shriveled. These words were uttered by Torgbui Wenya, the founder of Anlo State to convey his reluctance to move farther after he left his kinsmen in Wheta Atiteti to move to the seashore. The suffix ‘gã' denotes big in Ewe, so 'Anloga' (Ewe: Aŋlɔgã) literally means Big Anlo in reference to it being the traditional capital.

== Education ==
- Anlo Senior High School
- Keta Senior High Technical School
- Anlo Secondary School
- Anlo Technical Institute
- Zion Senior High School
- Keta Business College

== Notes ==
6. Felix Kuadugah- contributor. Etymology of Anloga
