= 2025 in Togo =

- Decades: 2000s; 2010s; 2020s
- See also: Other events of 2025; History of Togo

Events in the year 2025 in Togo.

== Incumbents ==
- President: Faure Gnassingbé (until 3 May); Jean-Lucien Savi de Tové (since 3 May)
- Prime Minister: Victoire Tomegah Dogbé (office abolished 3 May)
- President of the Council of Ministers: Faure Gnassingbé (office established 3 May)

== Events ==
=== February ===
- 15 February – 2025 Togolese Senate election: The ruling Union for the Republic wins 34 of 41 seats in the newly established Senate of Togo.

=== April ===
- 4 April – The Togo International Festival of Fashion is held in Lomé.

=== May ===
- 3 May –
  - 2025 Togolese presidential election: Jean-Lucien Savi de Tové is unanimously elected as president by the National Assembly.
  - President Faure Gnassingbé is appointed as President of the Council of Ministers by the National Assembly.

=== June ===
- 4 June – US President Donald Trump issues a proclamation imposing partial restrictions on Togolese nationals travelling to the United States.
- 16 June – The High Authority for Audiovisual Communication issues a three-month suspension of operations in Togo against Radio France Internationale and France 24, citing alleged bias in reporting.
- 29 June – At least seven people are reportedly killed and 60 arrested, following three days of protests against the government of Faure Gnassingbé in Lomé.

=== July ===
- 17 July – 2025 Togolese municipal elections: The ruling Union for the Republic wins 75% of the vote and 1,150 contested positions amid low turnout.
- 24 July – Protests erupt in Lomé against the new constitution and Prime Minister Faure Gnassingbé.

=== September ===
- 17 September – Former defense minister Essozimna Marguerite Gnakade, who is also a sister-in-law and critic of President Gnassingbé, is arrested at her residence.

== Holidays ==
- 1 January – New Year's Day
- 13 January – Liberation Day
- 30 March – Korité
- 21 April – Easter Monday
- 27 April – Independence Day
- 1 May – Labour Day
- 29 May – Ascension Day
- 6 June – Tabaski
- 9 June – Whit Monday
- 21 June – Martyrs' Day
- 15 August – Assumption Day
- 1 November – All Saints' Day
- 25 December – Christmas Day

== Deaths ==
- 23 April – Eugène Koffi Adoboli, 90, prime minister (1999–2000)
- 9 December – Ludovic Assemoassa, 45, footballer (Clermont Foot, Granada 74, national team)
