= 2026 in Togo =

- Decades: 2000s; 2010s; 2020s
- See also: Other events of 2026; History of Togo

Events in the year 2026 in Togo.

== Incumbents ==
- President: Jean-Lucien Savi de Tové
- President of the Council of Ministers: Faure Gnassingbé

== Events ==
- 20 January – Togolese authorities arrest and extradite former Burkinabé president Paul-Henri Sandaogo Damiba to Ouagadougou following a formal request from Burkina Faso.
- 31 January – A semitrailer truck and a bus collide in Centrale Region, killing 10 people and injuring nine.
- 8 March – A truck crashes into a tricycle in Kozah, killing 14 people and injuring 58.
- 18 May – Togo grants visa-free entry for 30 days to citizens of all African nations.

== Holidays ==
- 1 January – New Year's Day
- 13 January – Liberation Day
- 30 March – Korité
- 6 April – Easter Monday
- 27 April – Independence Day
- 1 May – Labour Day
- 29 May – Ascension Day
- 6 June – Tabaski
- 9 June – Whit Monday
- 21 June – Martyrs' Day
- 15 August – Assumption Day
- 1 November – All Saints' Day
- 25 December – Christmas Day

== Deaths ==
- 7 January – Madjoulba Batocfetou, agronomic engineer.
- 15 February – Bitokotipou Yagninim, 84, minister of justice (1990) and senator (since 2025).
- 8 April – Abass Kaboua, 63, senator (since 2025).
- 20 August – Messan Toudji, 29, footballer (Anges FC, Gomido, national team).
