= 2016 in Togo =

- Decades: 1990s; 2000s; 2010s; 2020s
- See also: Other events of 2016; History of Togo

Events in the year 2016 in Togo.

== Incumbents ==
- President: Faure Gnassingbé
- Prime Minister: Komi Sélom Klassou

== Events ==
- May 21: Opposition parties held demonstrations in Lomé calling for meaningful and proportional electoral reform under the Global Political Agreement of 2007 to introduce term limits.

== Sports ==
- August: Togo at the 2016 Summer Olympics
