= 2020 in Togo =

- Decades: 2000s; 2010s; 2020s
- See also: Other events of 2020; History of Togo

The following events occurred in Togo in the year 2020.

== Incumbents ==
- President: Faure Gnassingbé
- Prime Minister: Komi Sélom Klassou

== Events ==
- 7 January – Emeritus Archbishop of Lomé, Philippe Fanoko Kossi Kpodzro, calls for the suspension of the February 22 presidential election to pave the way for electoral reforms.
- 14 January – Authorities in Ivory Coast say they rescued 137 children from Benin, Ghana, Niger, Nigeria, and Togo, aged 6 to 17, who were the victims of traffickers and groomed to work on cocoa plantations or in prostitution.
- 22 January – Globeleq and the government of Togo sign an agreement to develop between 24MW and 30MW of reliable, low cost, 100% renewable energy to support Togo's industrial development.
- 22 February – 2020 Togolese presidential election: President Faure Gnassingbé of the Union for the Republic (UPR) is re-elected for his fourth term with 71% of the vote in the first round.
- 6 March – Togolese authorities announce the first COVID-19 case in the country, a 42-year-old Togolese woman who travelled between Germany, France, Turkey, and Benin before returning to Togo.
- 15 March – In a historic first, all Peace Corps volunteers worldwide are withdrawn from their host countries.
- 27 March – The first COVID-19 death occurs in the country.
- 27 April – Independence Day (from France, 1960)
- 25 May – Africa Day
- 14 September – COVID-19 pandemic in Togo: Togo receives 12 health workers sent by the government of Cuba.

== Deaths ==
- 11 April – Edem Kodjo, 81, politician, Prime Minister (1994–1996, 2005–2006) and Chairperson of the African Union Commission (1978–1983)
- 30 May – Yawovi Agboyibo, 76, politician, Prime Minister (2006–2007)
- 15 October – Fambaré Ouattara Natchaba, 75, politician, President of the National Assembly (2000–2005), Minister of Foreign Affairs (1992–1994) and MP (1994–2005).

== See also ==
- 2020 in West Africa
- 2020 in politics and government
- 2020s in political history
- Economic Community of West African States
- Community of Sahel–Saharan States
- COVID-19 pandemic in Togo
- COVID-19 pandemic in Africa
