= 2024 in Togo =

- Decades: 2000s; 2010s; 2020s
- See also: Other events of 2024; History of Togo

This is a timeline of events in the year 2024 in Togo.

== Incumbents ==
- President: Faure Gnassingbé
- Prime Minister: Victoire Tomegah Dogbé

== Events ==
- 25 March - The National Assembly adopts a new constitution approving the shift from a presidential form of government to a parliamentary one, with the President no longer being directed elected and instead selected by lawmakers. The measure is signed into law by President Gnassingbe on 6 May.
- 29 April - 2024 Togolese parliamentary election: The ruling Union for the Republic wins 108 of 113 seats in the National Assembly.

== Holidays ==
- 1 January – New Year's Day
- 13 January – Liberation Day
- 1 April – Easter Monday
- 10 April – Korité
- 27 April – Independence Day
- 1 May – Labour Day
- 9 May – Ascension Day
- 20 May – Whit Monday
- 16 June – Tabaski
- 21 June – Martyrs' Day
- 15 August – Assumption Day
- 1 November – All Saints' Day
- 25 December – Christmas Day

== Deaths ==
- 9 January – Philippe Fanoko Kpodzro, 93, Roman Catholic prelate and politician, bishop of Atakpamé (1976–1992), archbishop of Lomé (1992–2007) and president of the National Assembly (1991–1994).
