= 2022 in Togo =

- Decades: 2000s; 2010s; 2020s
- See also: Other events of 2022; History of Togo

Events in the year 2022 in Togo.

== Incumbents ==
- President: Faure Gnassingbé
- Prime Minister: Victoire Tomegah Dogbé

== Events ==
Ongoing — COVID-19 pandemic in Togo

11 May - Eight soldiers are killed and 13 others are injured during an ambush by Al-Qaeda-linked militants in Kpendjal Prefecture. The attack is believed to be connected to the current insurgency in Burkina Faso, making it the first Islamic extremist attack in Togo.

21 May - An elderly Italian couple and their son are kidnapped by jihadists in Southern Mali. A Togolese citizen is also reported to have been kidnapped along with the Italians, but authorities say that they are unable to confirm if this is true.

25 June - Togo and Gabon officially become members of the Commonwealth of Nations.

9 July - Seven teenagers are killed and two others injured after government forces airstrike a village in Savanes Region Authorities say that they mistook the teenagers for jihadists.

14 July - At least 12 civilians are killed by Islamic extremist gunmen during an attack against two villages in northern Togo.
