= 2021 in Togo =

- Decades: 2000s; 2010s; 2020s
- See also: Other events of 2021; History of Togo

Events in the year 2021 in Togo.

== Incumbents ==
- President: Faure Gnassingbé
- Prime Minister: Victoire Tomegah Dogbé

== Events ==
Ongoing — COVID-19 pandemic in Togo

== Deaths ==
- 9 April – Dahuku Péré, politician (born 1953).
