= 2017 in Togo =

- Decades: 1990s; 2000s; 2010s; 2020s
- See also: Other events of 2017; History of Togo

Events in the year 2017 in Togo.

== Incumbents ==
- President: Faure Gnassingbé
- Prime Minister: Komi Sélom Klassou

== Events ==
- August 19: 2017–18 Togolese protests: Two people are killed and 13 wounded during anti-government protests.
- September 7: For the second consecutive day, hundreds of thousands of Togolese protest against President Faure Gnassingbé's 50-year family dynasty. Parliament is set to consider presidential term limits when it reconvenes in October.
