= 2025 Togolese presidential election =

- 3 May 2025
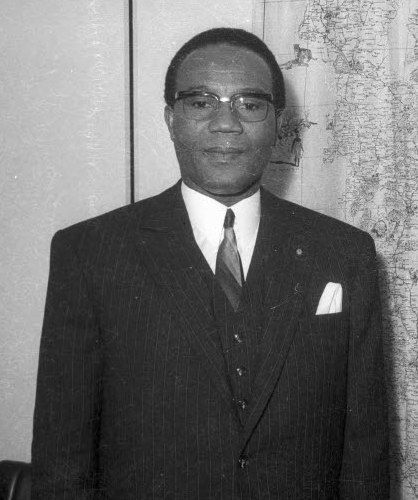
| Nominee | Jean-Lucien Savi de Tové |
| Party | CPP |
| Electoral vote | 150 |
| Percentage | 100% |
| Nominator | UNIR |
President before election
Faure Gnassingbé
UNIR
Elected President
Jean-Lucien Savi de Tové
CPP

Presidential elections were held in Togo on 3 May 2025 to choose a president for a four-year term. It was the first presidential election since the 2024 constitutional reforms, which abolished direct presidential elections and instead made the President of Togo indirectly elected by the National Assembly to serve a double four-year term. Incumbent President Faure Gnassingbé, who had been in office since May 2005, was ineligible for re-election.

The presidency is a largely ceremonial position, wielding little real power. The president's main role is meeting the leaders of each party following legislative elections to discuss nominations for prime minister, and giving a mandate to try and form a government to the candidate they deem most likely to succeed. The position with the real executive power is the president of the Council of Ministers, a position which was previously called the prime minister. The position was taken by Faure Gnassingbé.

Only one candidate, Jean-Lucien Savi de Tové, a former government minister and opposition to the Gnassingbé regime which has ruled the country since 1967, participated in the election. Savi de Tové, a member of the Pan-African Patriotic Convergence (CPP), was nominated by the ruling party Union for the Republic (UNIR). Since he was the only candidate, Savi de Tové unanimously won the vote and was immediately sworn in as president. Having taking office four days before his 86th birthday, Savi de Tové is the oldest ever president in Togolese history.

== Electoral system ==
Under the 2024 Constitution, the President of the Togolese Republic is elected for a four-year term, renewable once, by indirect ballot by an electoral college composed of members of the National Assembly and the Senate meeting in joint session.

This college must be convened by the President of the National Assembly within thirty days preceding the end of the outgoing Head of State's term. If the National Assembly is dissolved or if the end of the current legislature is less than three months away, the presidential election shall be convened within forty-five days following the installation of the new legislature. In the event of the permanent incapacity of the incumbent President of the Republic, the meeting of the electors shall be convened no later than forty-five days following the premature end of the outgoing President's term.

To be elected, a candidate must be nominated by one of the parliamentary groups in the National Assembly, be of exclusively Togolese nationality by birth, be over 50 years of age at the time of the election, enjoy full civil and political rights, and have resided in the country for more than one year. Finally, they must have been certified by three doctors accredited by the Constitutional Court as being in a general state of physical and mental well-being.

In the first two rounds, the candidate who achieves an absolute majority of the total number of members of the electoral college is elected. In the third round, the required majority is lowered to a simple majority.

== Results ==
The parliamentary group of the Union for the Republic nominated Jean-Lucien Savi de Tové, a long-time opponent of the government and former Minister of Commerce, for the presidency of the Republic. The only candidate in the running, he was unanimously elected by the 150 members of Congress present.

He became the first president of the Fifth Republic, an honorary position without any real prerogatives. As a historical figure of the opposition, this appointment surprised observers, and was seen as an attempt by Faure Gnassingbé to integrate an opponent into the leadership of the state to legitimize the regime transition.

| Candidate | Party | Votes | % |
|---|---|---|---|
| Jean-Lucien Savi de Tové | Pan-African Patriotic Convergence | 150 | 100.00 |
| Total | | 150 | 100.00 |
| Valid votes | | 150 | 100.00 |
| Invalid/blank votes | | 0 | 0.00 |
| Total votes | | 150 | 100.00 |
| Registered voters/turnout | | 174 | 86.21 |
Source: Official Portal of the Togolese Republic
