= 2023 in Togo =

- Decades: 2000s; 2010s; 2020s
- See also: Other events of 2023; History of Togo

Events in the year 2023 in Togo.

== Incumbents ==
- President: Faure Gnassingbé
- Prime Minister: Victoire Tomegah Dogbé

== Events ==
Ongoing — COVID-19 pandemic in Togo

- 14 December: Togolese Foreign Minister Robert Dussey announces an agreement with the Nigerien military junta for the country's transition to civilian rule, ready for presentation to the ECOWAS with the aim of lifting Niger's suspension from the body.
