= Gabon–Togo relations =

- Gabon: Togo

Gabon–Togo relations are the Bilateral relations between Gabon and Togo. Diplomatic relations between the two countries were established on June 21st, 1968. Gabon has a high commission in Lomé. Togo has a high commission in Libreville. Both nations are members of the African Union and the Commonwealth of Nations.

== History ==
On 24 February 2005, Togolese president Faure Gnassingbé met with Gabonese president Omar Bongo in Libreville about ECOWAS diplomatic pressure.

In April 2018, Gabonese foreign minister Noël Nelson Messone met with Togolese president Faure Gnassingbé and Togolese foreign minister Robert Dussey. Both countries talked together on working on political fields, economic, scientific, and cultural.

On 7 May 2019, Togolese president Faure Gnassingbé met with Gabonese president Ali Bongo to discuss regional security, counter-terrorism, and stability in the Sahel.

On 13 July 2020, Togolese president Faure Gnassingbé met with Gabonese president Ali Bongo to discuss economic cooperation.

On 2 December 2021, Gabonese prime minister Rose Christiane Raponda met with Togolese prime minister Victoire Tomegah Dogbé to discuss bilateral cooperation and friendship between the two nations.

== High-level visits ==
High level visits from Gabon to Togo

- Noël Nelson Messone (2018)
- Rose Christiane Raponda (2 December 2021)

High level visits from Togo to Gabon

- Faure Gnassingbé (24 February 2005)
- Faure Gnassingbé (7 May 2019)
- Faure Gnassingbé (13 July 2020)
