= 2018 in Togo =

- Decades: 1990s; 2000s; 2010s; 2020s
- See also: Other events of 2018; History of Togo

Events in the year 2018 in Togo.

== Incumbents ==
- President: Faure Gnassingbé
- Prime Minister: Komi Sélom Klassou

== Events ==
- January: the 2017–18 Togolese protests continue

== Deaths ==
- 2 February – Fábio Pereira de Azevedo, footballer (b. 1977).
