= Politics of Togo =

Politics of Togo takes place in a framework of a parliamentary republic, whereby the president is the head of state and the prime minister is head of government, who is appointed by the president with the parliament's approval. Executive power is exercised by the prime minister while the role of the president is largely ceremonial. Legislative power is vested in both the government and parliament. After independence, the party system was dominated first by the authoritarian Rally for the Togolese People, and later by its successor party, Union for the Republic.

== Eyadéma presidency ==
In the early 1990s, the international community began putting pressure on authoritarian president Gnassingbé Eyadéma to democratize, a notion he strongly resisted. Pro-democracy activists - mainly southern Mina and Ewé - were met with armed troops, killing scores of protesters in several clashes. The people of France and Togo were furious, and under their backlash Eyadéma gave in. He was summarily stripped of all powers and made president in name only. An interim prime minister was elected to take over command, but not four months later his residence was shelled with heavy artillery by Eyadéma's army.

Terror strikes against the independent press and political assassination attempts became commonplace, while the promised 'transition' to democracy came to a standstill. The opposition continued to call general strikes, leading to further violence by the army and the exodus of hundreds of thousands of southerners to Ghana and Benin. Using intimidation tactics and clever political machinations that disqualified one opposition party and caused another to refuse to participate, Eyadéma won the 1993 presidential elections with more than 96% of the vote. In the years following, opposition parties have lost most of their steam and Eyadéma's control has become almost as firm as before the crisis began.

In August 1996, Prime Minister Edem Kodjo resigned, and the planning minister, Kwassi Klutse, was appointed prime minister. Eyadéma won another five-year term in June 1998 with 52% of the vote, nearly being defeated by Gilchrist Olympio, son of Sylvanus Olympio. Later investigations revealed widespread human rights abuses.

In 2002, in what critics called a 'constitutional coup', the national assembly voted unanimously to change the constitution and allow Eyadéma to 'sacrifice himself again' and run for a third term during the 2003 presidential elections. The constitutional change eliminated presidential term limits. Meanwhile, Gilchrist Olympio's attempts to beat the man who overthrew his father were scuppered yet again when he was banned from running on a tax-law technicality.

Despite allegations of electoral fraud, Eyadéma won 57% of the votes in the 2003 elections, which international observers from the African Union described as generally free and transparent. For many Togolese, there was little optimism for the future and a prevailing sense of déjà vu as Eyadéma extended his record as Africa's longest-serving ruler.

== Gnassingbé presidency ==
On 5 February 2005, Eyadéma died of a heart attack. Shortly afterwards, his son Faure Gnassingbé was named by Togo's military as the country's leader, raising numerous eyebrows. Army Chief of Staff General Zakari Nandja announced the succession, saying the speaker of parliament (who should have taken over under the constitution) was out of the country. African Union leaders described the naming of Faure Gnassingbé as a military coup. The constitution of Togo declared that in the case of the president's death, the speaker of Parliament takes his place, and has 60 days to call new elections. However, on February 6, Parliament retroactively changed the Constitution, declaring that Faure would hold office for the rest of his father's term, with elections deferred until 2008.

The African Union described the takeover as a military coup d'état. International pressure came also from the United Nations. Within Togo, opposition to the takeover culminated in riots in which four people died. In response, Gnassingbé agreed to hold elections in April 2005. On 25 February, Gnassingbé resigned as president, soon after accepting nomination to run for the office in April. Parliament designated Deputy Speaker Bonfoh Abbass as interim president until the inauguration of the election winner. On 3 May 2005, Gnassingbé was sworn in as the new president garnering 60% of the vote according to official results. Disquiet has continued however with the opposition declaring the voting rigged, claiming the military stole ballot boxes from various polling stations in the South, as well as other election irregularities, such as telecommunication shutdown. The European Union has suspended aid in support of the opposition claims, while the African Union and the United States have declared the vote "reasonably fair" and accepted the outcome. The Nigerian president and Chair of the AU, Olusẹgun Ọbasanjọ, sought to negotiate between the incumbent government and the opposition to establish a coalition government, but surprisingly rejected an AU Commission appointment of former Zambian president, Kenneth Kaunda, as special AU envoy to Togo. Later in June, President Gnassingbe named opposition leader Edem Kodjo as the prime Minister.

From April 2006 onwards, reconciliation talks between the government and the opposition were held, which were suspended after Eyadema's death in 2005. In August the government and the opposition signed an accord providing for the participation of opposition parties in a transitional government.

In 2017, protests erupted against Faure Gnassingbé's continued rule. As the only African country without official presidential term limits, the opposition demands two-term limits for presidents to be applied retroactively in order to prevent Gnassingbe from standing in the 2020 and 2025 elections. Clashes between protesters and police have led to the death of 16 people since the start of the protests in September. International rights groups have called on the government to "end the bloody repression" and engage in dialogue with the opposition. Gnassingbé promised talks with the opposition, but has yet to act on that promise. However, Ghana's President Nana Akufo-Addo and Alpha Conde of Guinea are involved as mediators to facilitate the organization of a political dialogue to be held "in a few weeks".

In February 2020, Faure Gnassingbé was re-elected to a fourth presidential term. The opposition had a lot of accusations of fraud and irregularities. As of 2020, the Gnassingbé family had ruled Togo since 1967, making it Africa's longest lasting dynasty.

== Executive branch ==
Main office-holders
Office	Name	Party	Since
President	Faure Gnassingbé	Union for the Republic	4 May 2005
Prime Minister	Victoire Tomegah Dogbé	Union for the Republic	28 September 2020

The president is indirectly elected by parliament for a four-year term, renewable once. The prime minister is appointed by the president and they can serve a term of six years, renewable indefinitely. The Council of Ministers is appointed by the president on the advice of the prime minister.

== Legislative branch ==
The National Assembly (Assemblée Nationale) has 91 members, elected for a five-year term in single-seat constituencies. Togo is a one party dominant state with the Union for the Republic in power. Opposition parties are allowed, but are widely considered to have no real chance of gaining power.

== Judicial branch ==
The Togolese judiciary is modeled on the French system. There is a Court of Appeal (French: Cour d’Appel) and a Supreme Court (French: Cour Suprême).

== Administrative divisions ==
Togo is divided in five regions: Kara, Plateaux, Savanes, Centrale, Maritime. For administrative purposes, the regions are subdivided into 35 prefectures, each having an appointed prefect.

== International organization participation ==
ACCT, ACP, AfDB, Commonwealth of NationsECA, ECOWAS), Entente, FAO, FZ, G-77, IBRD, ICAO, ICC, ICRM, IDA, IFAD, IFC, IFRCS, ILO, IMF, IMO, Intelsat, Interpol, IOC, ITU, ITUC, MINURSO, MIPONUH, NAM, OAU, OIC, OPCW, UN, UNCTAD, UNESCO, UNIDO, UPU, WADB, WAEMU, WCO, EFTU, WHO, WIPO, WMO, WToO, WTrO.
