= Bitokotipou Yagninim =

Togolese politician (1941–2026)

Minister of Justice
- In office 1990
- President: Gnassingbé Eyadéma

Member of the Senate of Togo
- In office 2025 – 15 February 2026

Personal details
- Born: 31 December 1941 Bassar, French Togoland, French West Africa
- Died: 15 February 2026 (aged 84)
- Party: RPT, UNIR

Bitokotipou Yagninim (31 December 1941 – 15 February 2026) was a Togolese politician. A member of the Rally of the Togolese People, he served as minister of justice of Togo in 1990. He was elected to the Senate of Togo in 2025 for Dankpen constituency on behalf of the Union for the Republic (UNIR) and served until his death.

Yagninim died on 15 February 2026, at the age of 84.
