= 2019 in Togo =

- Decades: 1990s; 2000s; 2010s; 2020s
- See also: Other events of 2019; History of Togo

Events in the year 2019 in Togo.

== Incumbents ==
- President: Faure Gnassingbé
- Prime Minister: Komi Sélom Klassou

== Deaths ==
- 5 August – Jimi Hope, 62, musician and painter.

== See also ==
- 2019 in West Africa
- 2019 in politics and government
- 2010s in political history
- Economic Community of West African States
- Community of Sahel–Saharan States
