= Adrien Béléki Akouété =

Togolese politician

President of the Pan-African Patriotic Convergence
- Incumbent
- Assumed office 21 November 2020; Acting: 11 April – 21 November 2020
- Preceded by: Edem Kodjo

Secretary-General of the Trade Union Confederation of Togolese Workers
- In office 1993 – 21 December 2011
- Preceded by: Komi Pierre Dagba
- Succeeded by: Sébastien Ayikoué Tévi

Deputy General Secretary of the ITUC-Africa
- In office May 2020 – November 2023
- General Secretary: Kwasi Adu-Amankwah
- Preceded by: Eric Mwezi Manzi
- Succeeded by: Anselme Coovi Amoussou

Personal details
- Born: Togo
- Party: CPP

Adrien Béléki Akouété is a Togolese politician who has been the president of the Pan-African Patriotic Convergence (CPP) since 2020. He previously served as the Deputy General Secretary of the ITUC-Africa from 2020 to 2023 and Secretary-General of the Trade Union Confederation of Togolese Workers (CSTT) from 1993 to 2021.
