= Pan-African Patriotic Convergence =

Political party in Togo

Pan-African Patriotic Convergence Convergence patriotique panafricaine
- Abbreviation: CPP
- President: Adrien Béléki Akouété
- Founder: Edem Kodjo
- Founded: 15 August 1999; 27 years ago
- Headquarters: Lomé
- Ideology: Pan-Africanism
- Political position: Centre-left
- Colours: Black
- Senate: 0 / 41
- National Assembly: 0 / 113

The Pan-African Patriotic Convergence (French: Convergence patriotique panafricaine) is a political party in Togo. Adrien Béléki Akouété is the current president of the CPP since 2020. The CPP was created in August 1999 through the merger of four parties: the Togolese Union for Democracy (UTD), led by Kodjo, the Party of Action for Democracy (PAD), led by Francis Ekoh, the Party of Democrats for Unity (PDU), and the Union for Democracy and Solidarity (UDS), led by Antoine Foly.

The CPP, as part of the Coalition of Democratic Forces, boycotted the 2002 parliamentary election. Kodjo ran as the CPP's candidate in the 2003 presidential election. During the campaign, the CPP called for a debate on television between Kodjo and President Gnassingbé Eyadéma after the Rally of the Togolese People (RPT), the ruling party, engaged in what it considered personal attacks on Kodjo. In the election, Kodjo received 0.96% of the vote and took fifth place. The CPP called for the opposition to unite to choose a single candidate in the 2005 presidential election, following Eyadéma's death.

Following the 2005 presidential election, Kodjo was appointed as Prime Minister on 8 June 2005. In the government named under Kodjo on 20 June, another member of the CPP, Jean-Lucien Savi de Tové, was appointed Minister of Trade and Industry. The party participated in the 2007 parliamentary election, but did not win any seats. In the first ever indirect presidential elections held in May 2025, the ruling party, the Union for the Republic (UNIR), endorsed Jean-Lucien Savi de Tové for the presidency. He was eventually elected unanimously by the National Assembly and was immediately sworn in as president.

== Electoral history ==
=== Presidential elections ===
Election	Candidate	Votes	%	Results
2003	Edem Kodjo	22,482	1.0%	Lost ✗
2025	Jean-Lucien Savi de Tové	150	100%	Won ✓

=== National Assembly elections ===
Election	Leader	Votes	%	Seats	+/–	Position	Government
2002	Edem Kodjo	Boycotted		0 / 81	Steady		Extra-parliamentary
2007	Edem Kodjo	43,898	1.9%	0 / 81	Steady	▲4th	Extra-parliamentary
2013	Edem Kodjo	15,602	0.8%	0 / 91	Steady	▼5th	Extra-parliamentary
2018	Edem Kodjo			0 / 81		▼7th	Extra-parliamentary
2024	Adrien Béléki Akouété			0 / 113		▼11th	Extra-parliamentary

== See also ==
- Category:Pan-African Patriotic Convergence politicians
