= Council of Ministers of Togo =

The Council of Ministers of Togo consists of members appointed by the President with the advice of the Prime Minister.

The Council of Ministers is chaired by the President of the Council of Ministers and is tasked with managing government operations.

== Members of the Council of Ministers ==
On 1 October 2020 the government was announced as follows:

OFFICE	NAME
Prime Minister	Faure Gnassingbé
Minister of Accessibility and Rural Roads	Bouraïma Kanfitine Tchede Issa
Minister of Agriculture, Livestock and Rural Development	Antoine Lekpa Gbegbeni
Minister of the Armed Forces	Essozimna Marguerite Gnakadè
Minister of Commerce, Industry and Local Consumption	Kodjo Adedze
Minister of Communication and Media (and Government Spokesperson)	Akoda Eyewadan
Minister of Culture and Tourism	Kossi Lamadokou
Minister of Digital Economy and Digital Transformation	Cina Lawson
Minister of Economy and Finance	Sani Yaya
Minister of Environment and Forest Resources	Katari Foli-Bazi
Minister of Foreign Affairs, Regional Integration and Togolese Abroad	Robert Dussey
Minister of Grassroots Development, Youth, and Youth Employment	Myriam de Souza-D'Almeida
Minister of Health, Public Hygiene and Universal Access to Health Care	Moustafa Mijiyawa
Minister of Higher Education & Research	Ihou Wateba
Minister of Human Rights, Citizenship Training and Relationship with the Institutions of Government (and Government Spokesperson)	Christian Trimua
Minister of Investment Promotion	Rose Kayi Mivedo
Minister of Maritime Economy, Fisheries and Coastal Protection	Edem Kokou Tengue
Minister of Primary, Secondary, Technical and Craft Education:	Komla Dodzi Kokoroko
Minister of Public Service, Labor and Social Dialogue	Gilbert Bawara
Minister of Public Works	Zouréhatou Tcha-Kondo
Minister of Road, Rail and Air Transport	Affoh Atcha-Dedji
Minister of Security and Civil Protection	Damehame Yark
Minister of Social Action, Promotion of Women and Literacy	Adjovi Lonlongno Apedo
Minister of Sports and Leisure	Kama Lidi Kedjaka Gbessi
Minister of Territorial Administration, Decentralization, and Local Authorities	Payadowa Boukpessi
Minister of Town Planning, Housing and Land Reform	Koffi Tsolenyanou
Minister of Water and Village Hydraulics	Bolidja Tiem
Minister-Delegate to the Minister of Territorial Administration, Decentralization and Territorial Development	Essomanam Edjeba
Minister-Delegate to the Minister of Primary, Secondary, Technical and Crafts Education, in charge of technical and crafts education	Eke Odin
Minister-Delegate to the Minister of Health, Public Hygiene and Universal Access to Care, in charge of universal access to care	Mamissilé Akla Agba Assih

== History of the office ==
=== 1991 conflict with the presidency ===
In the months following the appointment of Joseph Kokou Koffigoh as prime minister by the National Conference on 27 August 1991, the soldiers of the Togolese Armed Forces (FAT) loyal to President Gnassingbé Eyadéma repeatedly tried to oust Koffigoh:

- On 1 October 1991, the soldiers seized the national radio and television station and demanded that Koffigoh resign before leaving the station; Koffigoh said afterwards on the radio that order was restored.
- On 8 October 1991, the soldiers unsuccessfully tried to kidnap Koffigoh, and four people were reported killed in protests and violence that followed.
- In late November 1991, the soldiers began a siege of Koffigoh's official residence in Lomé after Eyadéma's party, the Rally of the Togolese People (RPT), was banned by the transitional High Council of the Republic (HCR). They demanded that Koffigoh's government be replaced and threatening to "reduce the city to ashes"; they also demanded that the RPT be legalized again and that the HCR be dissolved. Koffigoh called for French military aid. Eyadéma publicly called on the soldiers to return to their barracks and expressed continued trust in Koffigoh, but also invited him to begin consultations on the formation of a new national unity government. After two days of talks, the soldiers lifted their siege; however, they promptly resumed it. Koffigoh then offered to include supporters of Eyadéma in the government, but he refused to dissolve his government altogether, and he again called for French aid. On 3 December 1991, the soldiers succeeded in capturing Koffigoh in a heavy assault on his official residence, involving tanks and machine guns. Many people were killed in this violence: at least 17, and possibly more than 200. The soldiers then took Koffigoh to meet with Eyadéma, who was widely believed to have been behind the soldiers' actions, although he did not take responsibility for them. Later on the same day, Eyadéma released a statement saying that he and Koffigoh would form a new transitional government. Although Koffigoh remained in office, his power was considered curtailed. On 31 December, a new government headed by Koffigoh was announced, including three members of the RPT; most members of the previous government remained in their posts.

=== 2024 constitutional reform ===
In March 2024, President Faure Gnassingbé has announced a new constitution. The proposed new constitution turns Togo from a presidential system to a federal parliamentary one, weakening the powers of the president, strengthening the powers of the prime minister, renaming the office the President of the Council of Ministers, and as well as giving the new role a maximum term of six years. The new constitution came into force in April 2024 after a vote in parliament.

== See also ==
- List of presidents of Togo
- List of prime ministers of Togo
- List of colonial governors of Togo
- Politics of Togo
