= Kwesi Ahoomey-Zunu =

Togolese politician and former Prime Minister

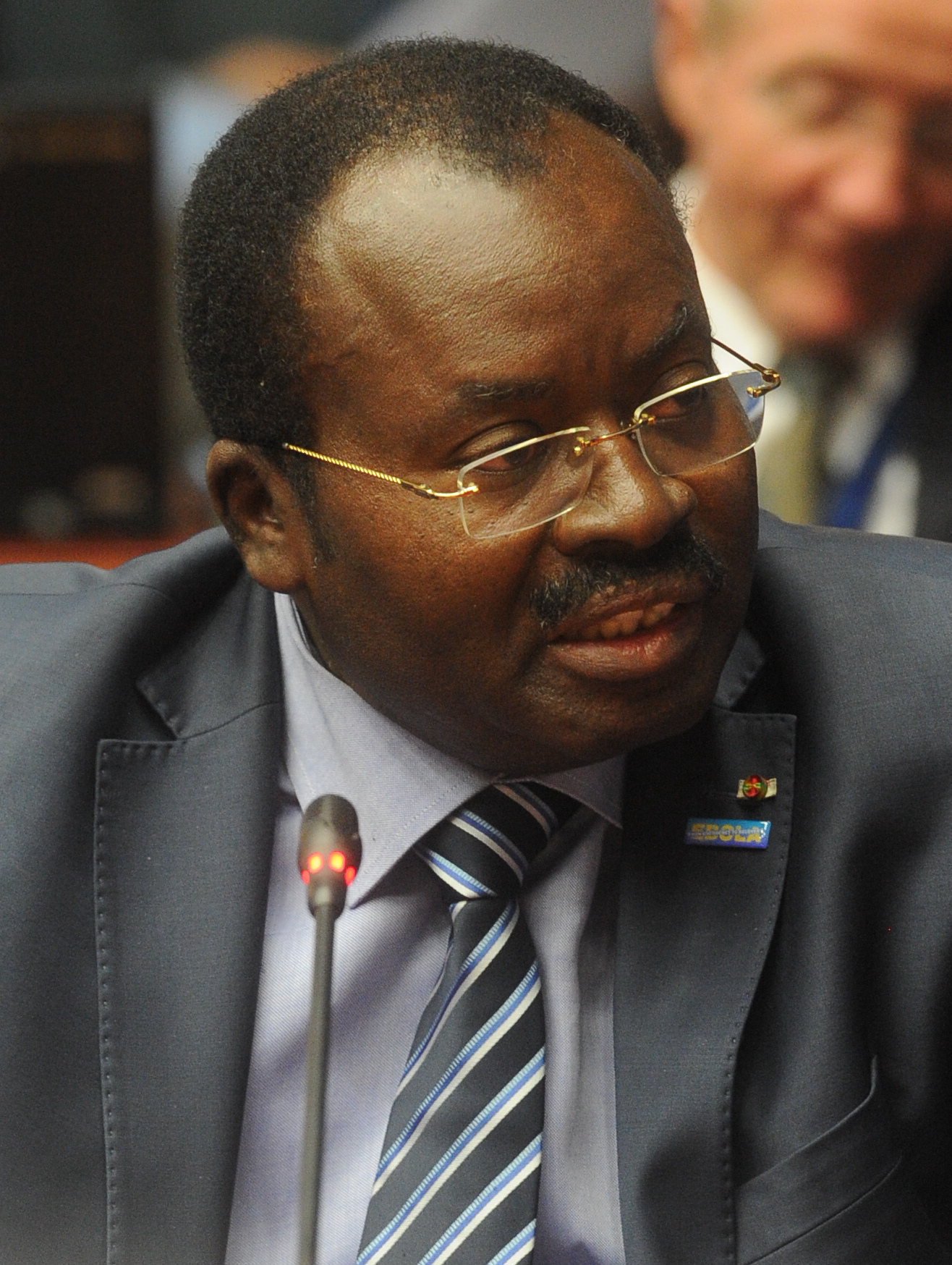

11th Prime Minister of Togo
- In office 23 July 2012 – 10 June 2015
- President: Faure Gnassingbé
- Preceded by: Gilbert Houngbo
- Succeeded by: Komi Sélom Klassou

Personal details
- Born: Arthème Kwesi Séléagodji Ahoomey-Zunu; 1 December 1958 (age 67)
- Party: Pan-African Patriotic Convergence (Before 2013); Union for the Republic (2013–present)

Kwesi Ahoomey-Zunu (born Arthème Kwesi Séléagodji Ahoomey-Zunu; 1 December 1958) is a Togolese politician who was Prime Minister of Togo from July 2012 to June 2015. He was previously Minister of Trade from March 2011 to July 2012.

== Biography ==
Ahoomey-Zunu attended Tokoin High School, a district in Lomé. He holds a Master's degree in International Relations (International Relations Law) and degrees in Public Law and Planning.

He is a member of the Pan-African Patriotic Convergence (CPP) founded by Edem Kodjo. From 1988 to 1994, he was secretary of the National Commission for Human Rights (CNDH). From 1994 to 1999, Ahoomey-Zunu was a member of the National Assembly. From 1993 to 2005, he was a member of the Independent National Electoral Commission, 2000-2002, of which he was president. Ahoomey-Zuno was Minister of Territorial Administration from September 2006 to December 2007 in Yawovi Agboyibo's cabinet. From March 2011 to July 2012, he was Minister of Trade and Promotion of the Private Sector. From January 2008 to July 2012, he was Secretary General of the President.

== Political career ==
Ahoomey-Zunu served as Minister of Territorial Administration and Secretary-General of the Presidency before being appointed Minister of Trade and the Promotion of the Private Sector in March 2011. He remained in the latter post for over a year; he was then appointed Prime Minister on 19 July 2012 following the resignation of Prime Minister Gilbert Houngbo. He took office on 23 July 2012.

Following the July 2013 parliamentary election, in which the ruling Union for the Republic (UNIR) won a large majority of seats, Ahoomey-Zunu was reappointed Prime Minister. A new government headed by Ahoomey-Zunu was appointed on 17 September 2013. The size of the government was reduced from 31 members to 26.

Following President Faure Gnassingbé's re-election in the April 2015 presidential election, he appointed Komi Sélom Klassou to succeed Ahoomey-Zunu as Prime Minister on 5 June 2015. Klassou took office on 10 June 2015.

Political offices
Preceded by Gilbert Houngbo	Prime Minister of Togo; 2012–2015	Succeeded by Komi Sélom Klassou
