= Palace of the Governors, Togo =

Coordinates: 6.1201°N 1.2121°E

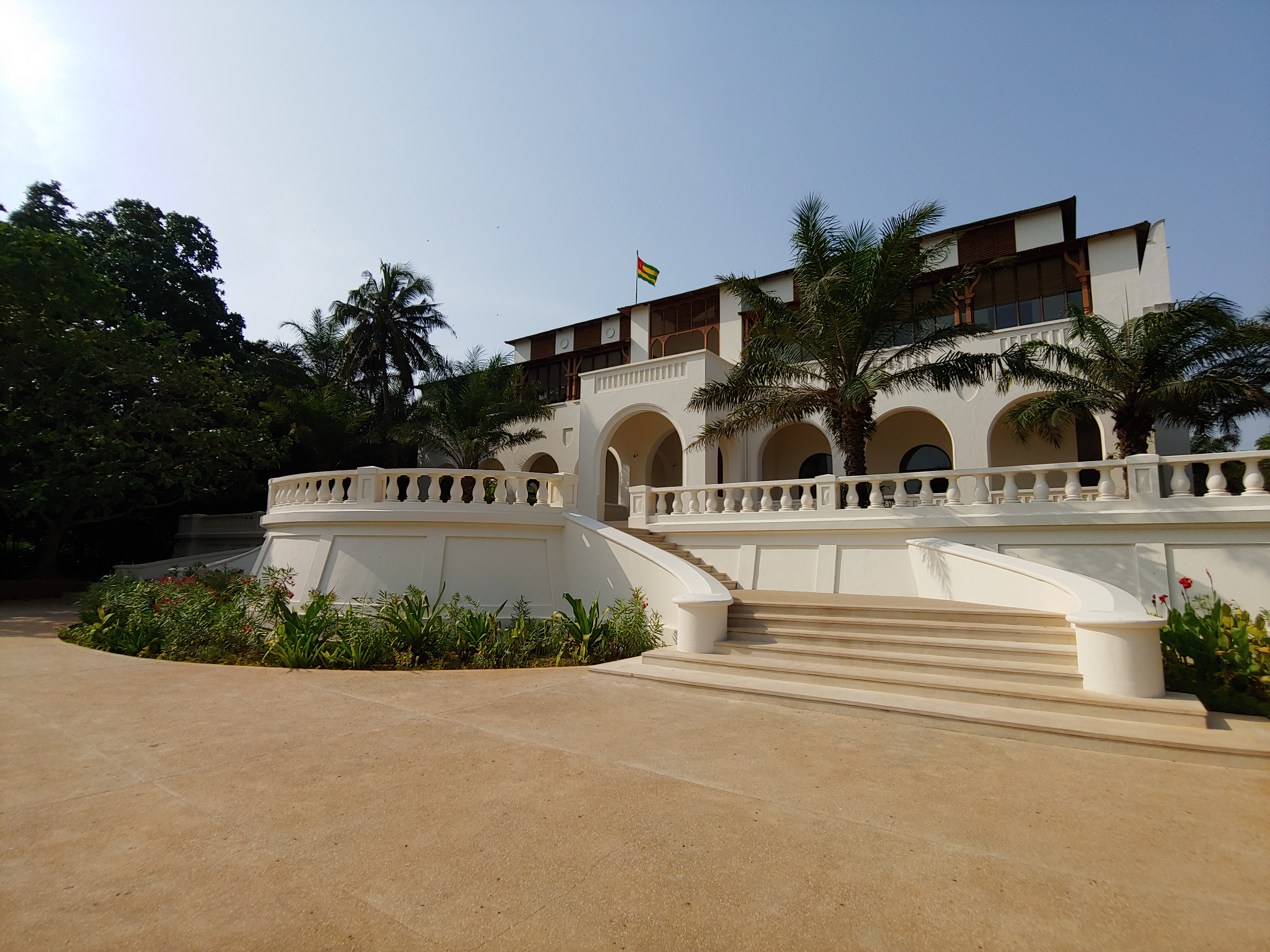
Palace of the Governors in 2019

The Palace of the Governors (French: palais des Gouverneurs) is the old official residence of the President of the Togolese Republic and the residence of the First Minister since 1991. It is located on the south-western side of the city of Lomé, the capital city of the Togolese Republic, next to the presidential residence.

== History ==
The building was designed by a joint team of German and Togolese architects and engineers and was built between 1898 and 1905. The original concept for the building was to construct a palace that would make an impression from long distances, such as boats coming to harbor in Lomé, its construction was started by the Governor August Köhler soon after Lomé was made the capital of the colony, one of the most prosperous German colonies, in an effort to show its power and prestige. The materials used originated from a unique mixture of local available and imported goods. They include red bricks, iron, local woods, and cement. The building is typical of German colonial architecture. Constructed in a vast park, which was accessed previously through a gate made out of two elephant tusks more than two metres long, it is surrounded with terraces and possesses a patio similar to that of the Royal Palace of King Toffa I, in Benin. The ground floor previously housed administrative services while the private quarters of the governors were on the first floor. The palace was expanded by French authorities after 1914 as Togo was ceded by Germany following World War I. After Togo took its independence in 1960, it became the seat of the presidency until 1976 when it became a residency for guests, and subsequently the seat of the Prime Minister in 1991, although it has suffered some damages from the political and social tensions of 1991 in Togo.

== World Heritage Status ==
This site was added to the UNESCO World Heritage Tentative List on January 8, 2002 in the Cultural category.

== Notes ==
- Les palais des gouverneurs - UNESCO World Heritage Centre Retrieved 2009-03-04.
