= Bonfoh Abass =

Togolese politician (1948–2021)

Acting President of Togo
- In office 25 February 2005 – 4 May 2005
- Prime Minister: Koffi Sama
- Preceded by: Faure Gnassingbé
- Succeeded by: Faure Gnassingbé

Personal details
- Born: 23 November 1948 Kabou, Bassar Prefecture, French Togoland (now Togo)
- Died: 29/30 June 2021 (aged 72)
- Education: Institut Nationale de l'Administration Scolaire (France)
- Occupation: Politician

El-Hadj Bonfoh Abass (/boʊnˈfoʊ ɑːbˈæs/; 23 November 1948 – 29/30 June 2021) was a Togolese politician who was the interim President of Togo from 25 February 2005 to 4 May 2005. He was the President of the National Assembly of Togo from February 2005 to July 2013.

== Political career ==
Bonfoh was born in Kabou, Bassar Prefecture. From 1980 to 1985, he was Regional Director of Educational Planning in Kpalimé, and in August 1986 he became Regional Director of Educational Planning in Kara, serving in the latter post until 1999. He was elected to the National Assembly in the March 1999 parliamentary election, standing as the RPT candidate in the Third Constituency of Bassar Prefecture and winning the seat with 90.68% of the vote. He was re-elected from Bassar in the October 2002 parliamentary election. In the National Assembly, he served as First Rapporteur of the Socio-Cultural Development Committee and was elected First Vice-President of the National Assembly.

Abass became President of Togo when President Faure Gnassingbé resigned due to pressure from the international community in February 2005. Bonfoh, who was First Vice-President of the National Assembly at the time, was elected as President of the National Assembly and thus became acting President of Togo prior to a new presidential election. Bonfoh was a strong supporter of Gnassingbé, and was deemed a "chairwarmer" by some of his opponents because his temporary assumption of the presidency was meant to enable Gnassingbé to eventually become president in a seemingly more legitimate way. On 23 April 2005, Bonfoh dismissed the interior minister for advocating a delay in the election amidst massive street protests.

Gnassingbé officially won the election on 24 April and was sworn in on 4 May, replacing Bonfoh.

In the October 2007 parliamentary election, Bonfoh ran for re-election to the National Assembly as the first candidate on the candidate list of the ruling Rally of the Togolese People (RPT) in Bassar, and he was successful in winning a seat. On 24 November 2007, he was re-elected as President of the National Assembly.

Abass actively campaigned for Gnassingbé prior to the March 2010 presidential election. Following the election, in which Gnassingbé won a second term, Abass said in May 2010 that the people wanted "tangible achievements" and that Gnassingbé was delivering them. He particularly noted the importance of improving the availability of potable water, quality education, and medicine, and he anticipated that Gnassingbé would make continued progress on those issues. Abass also discussed the need to move forward with institutional and constitutional reforms, anticipating that relevant draft laws would soon be submitted to the National Assembly and quickly approved. He dismissed rumors of an impending dissolution of the National Assembly.

Following the July 2013 parliamentary election, Dama Dramani, another Gnassingbé loyalist, was elected to succeed Abass on 2 September 2013.

=== Party positions ===
Bonfoh was a member of the Political Bureau of the RPT and a member of the RPT Central Committee from Bassar Prefecture as of the RPT's Ninth Ordinary Congress in December 2006.

Preceded by Faure Gnassingbé	President of Togo; 2005	Succeeded by Faure Gnassingbé
