= Komi Sélom Klassou =

Prime Minister of Togo from 2015 to 2020

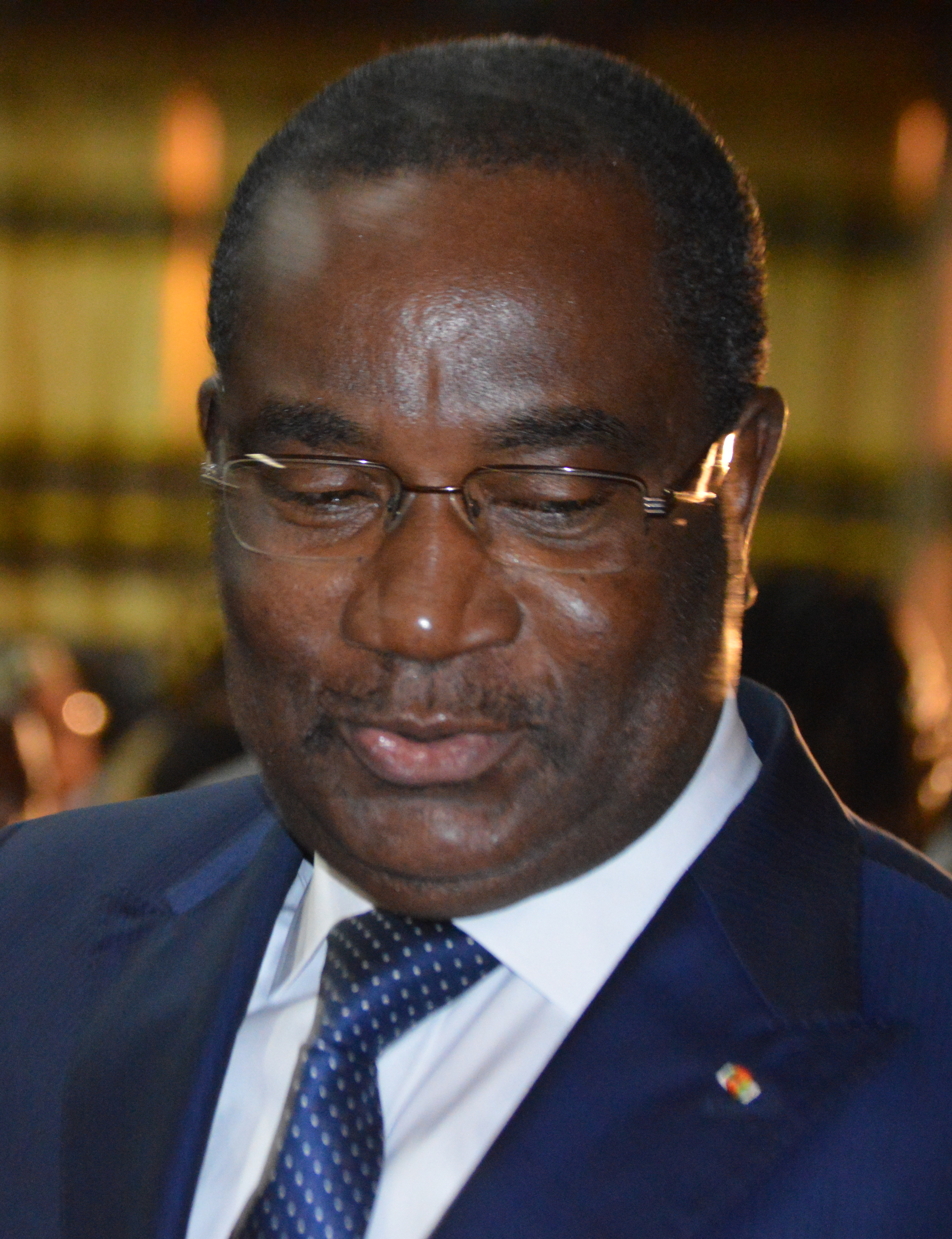
- Klassou in 2017

12th Prime Minister of Togo
- In office 10 June 2015 – 28 September 2020
- President: Faure Gnassingbé
- Preceded by: Kwesi Ahoomey-Zunu
- Succeeded by: Victoire Tomegah Dogbé

First Vice President of the National Assembly
- In office 6 December 2007 – 10 June 2015
- President: Bonfoh Abass; Dama Dramani

Minister of Primary and Secondary Education
- In office 2003 – 6 December 2007
- Prime Minister: Koffi Sama; Edem Kodjo

Minister of Culture, Youth and Sports
- In office 31 January 2000 – 2003
- Prime Minister: Agbéyomé Kodjo; Koffi Sama

Personal details
- Born: 10 February 1960 (age 66) Notsé, Togo
- Party: UNIR (since 2012)
- Other political affiliations: RPT (before 2012)

Komi Sélom Klassou (born 10 February 1960) is a Togolese politician who served as 12th prime minister of Togo from 2015 to 2020. A member of the ruling Union for the Republic (UNIR), he served as Minister of Culture, Youth and Sports from 2000 to 2003, as Minister of Primary and Secondary Education from 2003 to 2007, and as first vice president of the National Assembly from 2007 to 2015.

== Life and career ==
Klassou was born in Notsé in Haho Prefecture. He was appointed Minister of Culture, Youth and Sports in the government named on October 8, 2000, serving in that position until he was appointed Minister of Primary and Secondary Education in the government named on July 29, 2003. He also directed Faure Gnassingbé's campaign in the April 2005 presidential election, and after the Constitutional Court declared Gnassingbé the winner of the election, which was disputed by the opposition, Klassou called it "a great victory for the people of Togo".

Klassou served as Minister of Primary and Secondary Education for more than four years. He was the first candidate on the Rally of the Togolese People's candidate list for Haho Prefecture in the October 2007 parliamentary election and was successful in winning a seat. On November 24, 2007, he was elected as the First Vice-President of the National Assembly, and he was replaced in his ministerial post in the government named on December 13, 2007.

Klassou was a member of the Political Bureau of the RPT.

Klassou was re-elected to the National Assembly in the July 2013 parliamentary election, and he was re-elected as First Vice-President of the National Assembly on 2 September 2013.

Klassou was appointed Prime Minister of Togo on 5 June 2015 following President Gnassingbé's re-election in the April 2015 presidential election. Klassou took office on 10 June 2015, succeeding Kwesi Ahoomey-Zunu. The composition of the new government headed by Klassou, which included 23 ministers, was announced on 28 June 2015.

By September 2020, President Faure Gnassingbé announced that Klassou had resigned.

Political offices
Preceded by Kwesi Ahoomey-Zunu	Prime Minister of Togo; 2015–2020	Succeeded by Victoire Tomegah Dogbé
