= Koffi Sama =

Togolese politician and former Prime Minister

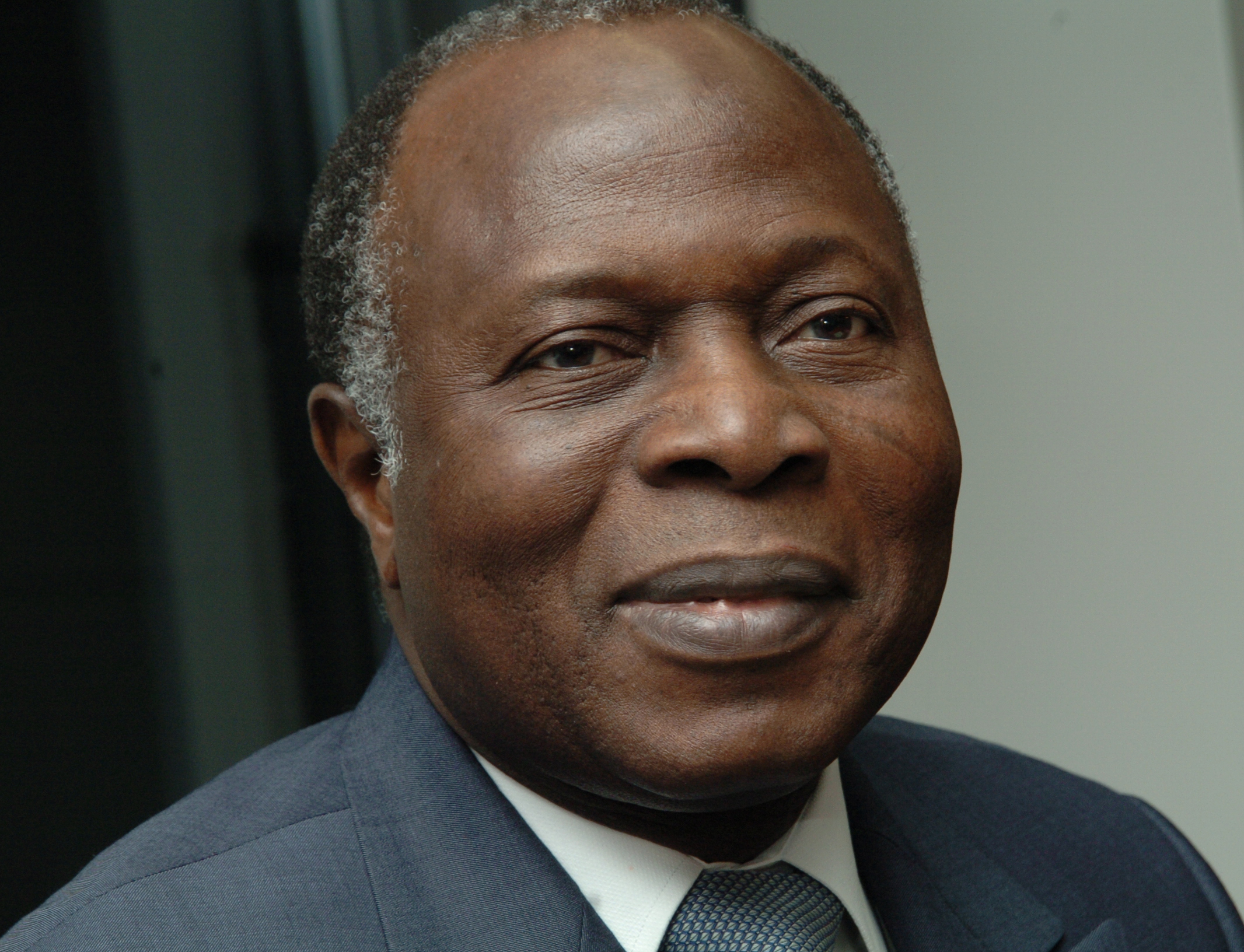

7th Prime Minister of Togo
- In office 29 June 2002 – 9 June 2005
- President: Gnassingbé Eyadéma; Faure Gnassingbé; Bonfoh Abass (Acting)
- Preceded by: Agbéyomé Kodjo
- Succeeded by: Edem Kodjo

Personal details
- Born: 1944 (age 81–82) Ogou Prefecture, Togoland
- Party: Rally of the Togolese People
- Occupation: Politician

Koffi Sama (born 1944) was the Prime Minister of Togo from 29 June 2002 to 9 June 2005.

== Biography ==
Sama was born at Amoutchou in Ogou Prefecture. He was Minister of Youth, Sports, and Culture from 1981 to 1984, Regional Director of Rural and Maritime Region Development from 1986 to 1990, and Director-General of the Togolese Cotton Company from 1990 to 1996, before re-entering the government as Minister of Health, in which position he served from 1996 to 1999.

In the March 1999 parliamentary election, Sama was elected to the National Assembly as the candidate of the ruling Rally of the Togolese People (RPT) in the Third Constituency of Ogou Prefecture; he ran unopposed and won the seat with 100% of the vote. He then served as Minister of National Education and Research from 1999 to 2002. On 7 December 2000, he also became the Secretary-General of the RPT.

President Gnassingbé Eyadéma appointed Sama as Prime Minister on 27 June 2002, replacing Agbeyome Kodjo; this move was said to have been done as part of preparations for the parliamentary election that was held later in the year. Following the death of Eyadéma on 5 February 2005, Sama, as Prime Minister, announced the news, calling it a "national catastrophe". Sama left office on 9 June 2005, when he was succeeded by Edem Kodjo.

After serving as Prime Minister, Sama became a Special Advisor to President Faure Gnassingbé, with the rank of Minister; he remains in that post as of 2008. He was the head of the Economic Community of West African States (ECOWAS) observer mission in the Malian April 2007 presidential election.

Sama was a member of the RPT College of Sages.

| Preceded by Agbeyome Kodjo | Prime Minister of Togo; 2002-2005 | Succeeded by Edem Kodjo |
