= President of Togo =

Head of state

- Président du Togo
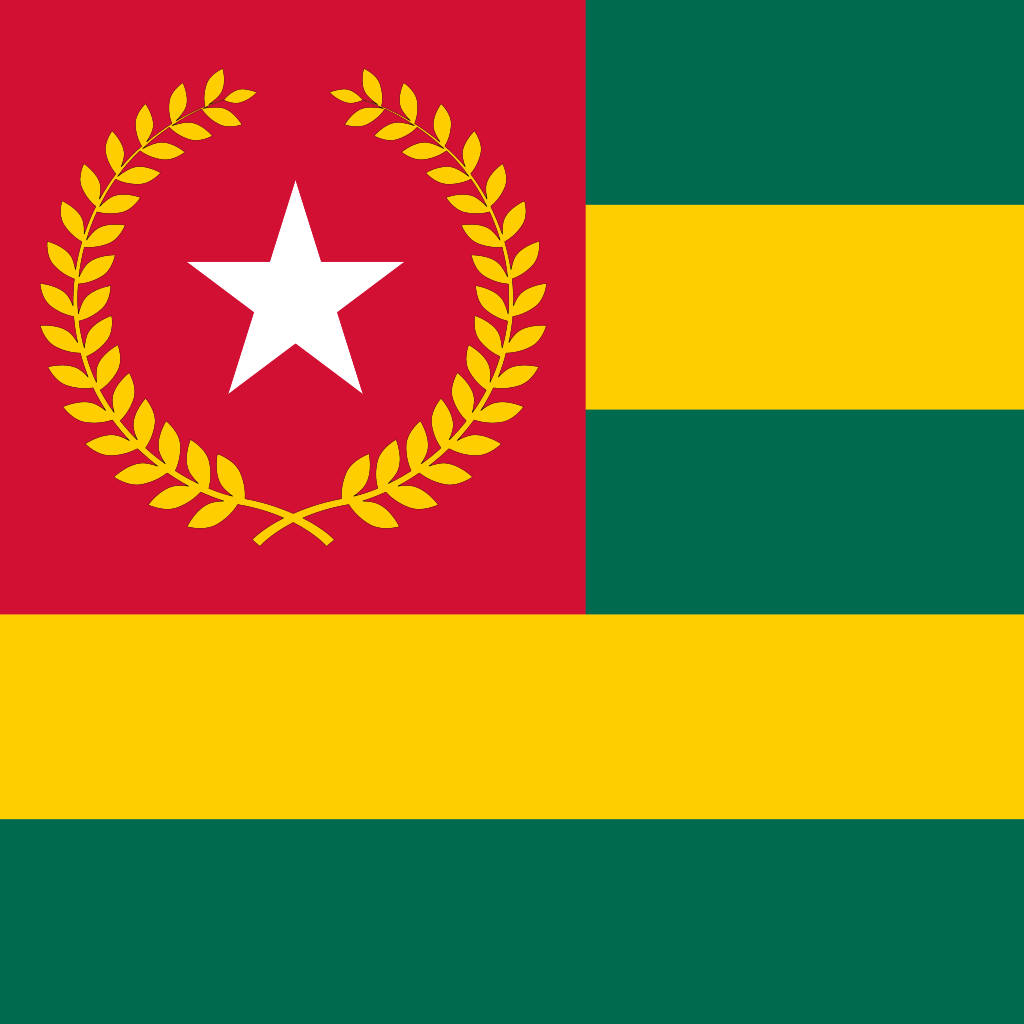
- Presidential Standard

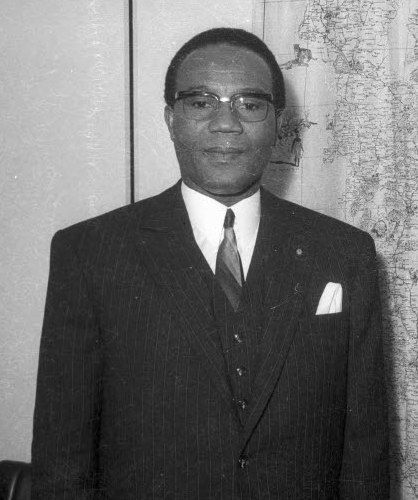
- Incumbent; Jean-Lucien Savi de Tové since 3 May 2025
- Type: Head of state; Commander-in-chief
- Residence: New Presidential Palace, Lomé
- Nominator: Parliament
- Appointer: Parliament
- Term length: Four years, renewable once
- Constituting instrument: Constitution of Togo (2024)
- Formation: 27 April 1960; 66 years ago
- First holder: Sylvanus Olympio

The president of Togo (French: Président du Togo), officially the president of the Togolese Republic (French: Président de la République togolaise), is the head of state of Togo. The president is mostly, though not entirely, ceremonial as the actual executive power lies in the prime minister, a powerful role that is the head of the cabinet. The current president is Jean-Lucien Savi de Tové, who took office on 3 May 2025. He is also the oldest president ever in Togolese history.

For most of Togo's independence, the country had a presidential system in which the president was not only the head of state, but also the head of government and that the role had much power over both domestic and foreign policy. However, constitutional reforms adopted in April 2024 reduced the president's powers, made the role more ceremonial, and moved the country towards a more parliamentary system.

While the role became ceremonial, the president is still the commander-in-chief of the Togolese Armed Forces and still has the power to appoint the president of the Council of Ministers and the government. The reform also changed the way the president is elected, from being directly elected by citizens to being indirectly elected by Parliament.

A total of five people have served as president (not counting one acting president and two interim military officeholders). Additionally, one person, Faure Gnassingbé, has served on two non-consecutive occasions: first from the death of his father, Gnassingbé Eyadéma, on 5 February 2005 until his resignation 20 days later on 25 February and the second one from 4 May 2005 until 3 May 2025.

== Description of the office ==
=== Election ===
The president of the Republic is indirectly elected by an electoral college composed of members of the National Assembly and the Senate for a mandate of four years.

The president is re-eligible for a second term as there is a two-term limit for the president in the Constitution of Togo which was reinstated in 2019. This limit has been lifted for Gnassingbé Eyadéma in 2002 and for Faure Gnassingbé in 2019.

This college must be convened by the President of the National Assembly within thirty days preceding the end of the outgoing President's term. If the National Assembly is dissolved or if the end of the current legislature is less than three months away, the presidential election shall be convened within forty-five days following the installation of the new legislature. In the event of the permanent incapacity of the incumbent President of the Republic, the meeting of the electors shall be convened no later than forty-five days following the premature end of the outgoing President's term.

To be elected, a candidate must be nominated by one of the parliamentary groups in the National Assembly, be of exclusively Togolese nationality by birth, be over 50 years of age at the time of the election, enjoy full civil and political rights, and have resided in the country for more than one year. Finally, they must have been certified by three doctors accredited by the Constitutional Court as being in a general state of physical and mental well-being.

In the first two rounds, the candidate who achieves an absolute majority of the total number of members of the electoral college is elected. In the third round, the required majority is lowered to a simple majority.

=== Oath of office ===
Before he enters into office, the president of the Republic swears before the Constitutional Court meeting in solemn hearing, in these terms:

Before God and before the Togolese people, sole holders of popular sovereignty, We _____, elected President of the Republic in accordance with the laws of the Republic, solemnly swear.

— to respect and to defend the Constitution that the Togolese people have freely given themselves;

— to loyally fulfil the high functions that the Nation has confided in us.

— to be guided solely by the general interest and the respect of the rights of the human person, to consecrate all our forces to the promotion of development, of the common good, of peace and national unity;

— to preserve the integrity of the national territory;

— to conduct ourselves at all times, as a faithful and loyal servant of the People.

=== Vacancy ===
In case of a vacancy of the presidency of the Republic by death, resignation or definitive incapacity, the presidential function is exercised provisionally by the president of the National Assembly.

The vacancy is declared by the Constitutional Court referred to [the matter] by the Government.

The Government convokes the electoral body within sixty (60) days of the opening of the vacancy for the election of a new president of the Republic.

== Residences ==
After independence, the President of Togo used the Palace of the Governors as an office and residence. The Palace was formerly used by both German and French colonial administrators. In 1970, President Gnassingbé Eyadéma moved into a new Presidential Palace built near the Palace of the Governors. Another residence used by the Gnassingbé Eyadéma was the Presidential Residence of Lomé II. In 2006, a new Presidential Palace, financed by China, was inaugurated by President Faure Gnassingbé on the outskirts of Lomé.

== List of officeholders ==
Political parties

Party of Togolese Unity (PUT)
Togolese People's Movement (MPT)
Rally of the Togolese People (RPT)
Union for the Republic (UNIR)
Pan-African Patriotic Convergence (CPP)

Other factions

Military

Status

Denotes acting or interim head of state

Symbols

^{§} Elected unopposed

^{P} Presidential referendum

^{†} Died in office

No.	Portrait	Name (Birth–Death)	Term of office			Political party	Elected	Prime minister(s)	Ref.
No.	Portrait	Name (Birth–Death)	Took office	Left office	Time in office	Political party	Elected	Prime minister(s)	Ref.
1		Sylvanus Olympio (1902–1963)	27 April 1960	13 January 1963 ^{[†]} (Assassinated in a coup)	2 years, 261 days	Party of Togolese Unity	1961^{[§]}	Himself	
–		Emmanuel Bodjollé (1928–1994) (Note: Styled as Chairman of the Insurrection Committee.)	13 January 1963	15 January 1963	2 days	Military	–	Position abolished	
2		Nicolas Grunitzky (1913–1969)	16 January 1963	13 January 1967 (Deposed in a coup)	3 years, 362 days	Togolese People's Movement	1963^{[§]}	Position abolished	
–		Kléber Dadjo (1914–1988/89) (Note: Styled as Chairman of the National Reconciliation Committee.)	16 January 1967	14 April 1967	91 days	Military	–	Position abolished	
3		Gnassingbé Eyadéma (1935–2005) (Note: Previously named Étienne Eyadéma; changed name on 8 May 1974 due to the policy of Africanization, and to commemorate survival of a crash of his Douglas C-47 Skytrain presidential plane on 24 January 1974.)	14 April 1967	5 February 2005^{[†]}	37 years, 297 days	Military (until 1969)	–	Koffigoh; E. Kodjo; Klutse; Adoboli; A. Kodjo; Sama	
3		Gnassingbé Eyadéma (1935–2005)	14 April 1967	5 February 2005^{[†]}	37 years, 297 days	Rally of the Togolese People	1972^{[P]}	Koffigoh; E. Kodjo; Klutse; Adoboli; A. Kodjo; Sama	
3		Gnassingbé Eyadéma (1935–2005)	14 April 1967	5 February 2005^{[†]}	37 years, 297 days	Rally of the Togolese People	1979^{[§]}	Koffigoh; E. Kodjo; Klutse; Adoboli; A. Kodjo; Sama	
3		Gnassingbé Eyadéma (1935–2005)	14 April 1967	5 February 2005^{[†]}	37 years, 297 days	Rally of the Togolese People	1986^{[§]}	Koffigoh; E. Kodjo; Klutse; Adoboli; A. Kodjo; Sama	
3		Gnassingbé Eyadéma (1935–2005)	14 April 1967	5 February 2005^{[†]}	37 years, 297 days	Rally of the Togolese People	1993	Koffigoh; E. Kodjo; Klutse; Adoboli; A. Kodjo; Sama	
3		Gnassingbé Eyadéma (1935–2005)	14 April 1967	5 February 2005^{[†]}	37 years, 297 days	Rally of the Togolese People	1998	Koffigoh; E. Kodjo; Klutse; Adoboli; A. Kodjo; Sama	
3		Gnassingbé Eyadéma (1935–2005)	14 April 1967	5 February 2005^{[†]}	37 years, 297 days	Rally of the Togolese People	2003	Koffigoh; E. Kodjo; Klutse; Adoboli; A. Kodjo; Sama	
4		Faure Gnassingbé (born 1966) (Note: Son of Gnassingbé Eyadéma.)	5 February 2005 (Note: Proclaimed president by General Zakari Nandja, Chief of Staff of the Togolese Armed Forces, and confirmed by the National Assembly.)	25 February 2005 (Resigned) (Note: Stepped down due to heavy regional pressure, caused over doubts regarding the constitutional legitimacy of his succession.)	20 days	Rally of the Togolese People	–	Sama	
–		Bonfoh Abass (1948–2021) (Note: Succeeded Eyadéma as the constitutional successor, President of the National Assembly.)	25 February 2005	4 May 2005	68 days	Rally of the Togolese People	–	Sama	
(4)		Faure Gnassingbé (born 1966)	4 May 2005	3 May 2025	19 years, 364 days	Rally of the Togolese People (until 2012)	2005	Sama; E. Kodjo; Agboyibo; Mally; Houngbo; Ahoomey-Zunu; Klassou; Tomegah Dogbé	
(4)		Faure Gnassingbé (born 1966)	4 May 2005	3 May 2025	19 years, 364 days	Rally of the Togolese People (until 2012)	2010	Sama; E. Kodjo; Agboyibo; Mally; Houngbo; Ahoomey-Zunu; Klassou; Tomegah Dogbé	
(4)		Faure Gnassingbé (born 1966)	4 May 2005	3 May 2025	19 years, 364 days	Union for the Republic	2015	Sama; E. Kodjo; Agboyibo; Mally; Houngbo; Ahoomey-Zunu; Klassou; Tomegah Dogbé	
(4)		Faure Gnassingbé (born 1966)	4 May 2005	3 May 2025	19 years, 364 days	Union for the Republic	2020	Sama; E. Kodjo; Agboyibo; Mally; Houngbo; Ahoomey-Zunu; Klassou; Tomegah Dogbé	
5		Jean-Lucien Savi de Tové (born 1939)	3 May 2025	Incumbent	1 year, 193 days	Pan-African Patriotic Convergence	2025	Gnassingbé	

== See also ==
- Vice President of Togo
- Prime Minister of Togo
- List of colonial governors of Togo
- Politics of Togo
