= Constitution of Togo =

Fundamental law of Togo since 2024

Constitution of the Togolese Republic

Overview
- Original title: (in French) Constitution togolaise du 6 mai 2024
- Jurisdiction: Togo
- Created: 25 March 2024
- Presented: 25 March 2024
- Ratified: 19 April 2024
- Date effective: 6 May 2024 (2 years ago)
- System: Unitary parliamentary republic

Government structure
- Branches: Two (Executive and Legislature)
- Head of state: President
- Chambers: Unicameral
- Executive: President of the Council of Ministers
- Federalism: Yes
- Signatories: President

The Constitution of Togo (French: Constitution du Togo), officially called the Constitution of the Togolese Republic (French: Constitution de la République togolaise) is the supreme law of Togo. It was formally adopted on 6 May 2024. It replaced the 1992 Constitution.

== Former Constitutions ==
- 1960 Constitution
- 1963 Constitution
- 1979 Constitution
- 1992 Constitution
