= Jean-Lucien Savi de Tové =

President of Togo since 2025

His Excellency Jean-Lucien Savi de Tové
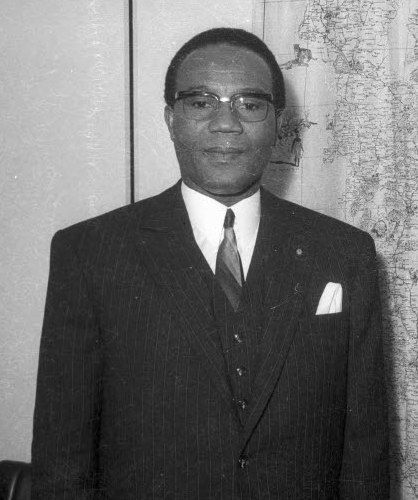
- Savi de Tové in 1970

5th President of Togo
- Incumbent
- Assumed office 3 May 2025
- Prime Minister: Faure Gnassingbé
- Preceded by: Faure Gnassingbé

Minister of Trade, Industry and Handicrafts
- In office 20 June 2005 – December 2007
- Prime Minister: Edem Kodjo; Yawovi Agboyibo
- Preceded by: Tankpadja Lalle
- Succeeded by: Yandja Yentchabré

Vice President of the Pan-African Patriotic Convergence
- In office 15 August 1999 – 6 December 2007
- President: Edem Kodjo
- Preceded by: Position established
- Succeeded by: Vacant

Secretary-General of the Ministry of Foreign Affairs
- In office 6 February 1967 – 21 November 1974
- Minister: Joachim Hunlede
- Succeeded by: Kouanvi Tigoue (interim)

Personal details
- Born: 7 May 1939 (age 87) Lomé, French Togoland
- Party: CPP (since 1999)
- Other political affiliations: PDU (1991–1999); Independent (before 1969; 1986–1991; 1994); RPT (1969–1986)
- Parent(s): Jonathan Savi de Tové, Regina Bruce
- Education: Institut d'études politiques de Bordeaux; Sorbonne University; University of Naples Federico II

Jean-Lucien Kwassi Lanyo Savi de Tové (born 7 May 1939) is a Togolese politician and civil servant who has served as the fifth president of Togo since 2025. A member of the Pan-African Patriotic Convergence (CPP), he previously held the post of Minister of Trade, Industry and Handicrafts in the governments of Edem Kodjo and Yawovi Agboyibo from 2005 to 2007.

A former opposition figure, Savi de Tové was imprisoned during the presidency of Gnassingbé Eyadéma before later joining the government. After the foundation of the CPP in 1999, he was appointed its vice-president. He stood unsuccessfully for the National Assembly in the 2007 parliamentary election and was dismissed from the government the same year, resigning as vice-president of the CPP on the same day.

In May 2025, following the entry into force of the 2024 constitutional reform that converted Togo from a presidential to a parliamentary system, Savi de Tové was unanimously elected president by Parliament (the National Assembly and Senate meeting in Congress). The reform reduced the presidency to a largely ceremonial office elected indirectly by Parliament and transferred most executive powers to the new post of president of the Council of Ministers. Savi de Tové succeeded Faure Gnassingbé, who assumed the latter office and retained the bulk of executive authority. Taking office four days before his 86th birthday, Savi de Tové is the oldest person to have become president of Togo.

== Early life and education ==
Savi de Tové was born in Lomé into an Ewe family. He graduated in law from the University of Bordeaux and later obtained a doctorate in political science from the Sorbonne and a diploma in economic development studies from the University of Naples.

== Political career ==
Following the 1967 Togolese coup d'état, Savi de Tové was appointed Secretary-General of the Ministry of Foreign Affairs on 6 February 1967 at the age of 28. In 1969, when President Gnassingbé Eyadéma founded the Rally of the Togolese People (RPT), the sole legal party, Savi de Tové joined it.

He was replaced as Secretary-General on an interim basis by Kouanvi Tigoue in 1974 and permanently by Kodjo de Medeiros in 1975. Accused of involvement in a coup plot with other political figures including Gilchrist Olympio, he was the subject of an arrest warrant issued on 12 July 1979 and was imprisoned. In August 1979, he was convicted with four others and sentenced to ten years' imprisonment.

In 1986 Savi de Tové left the RPT and became an independent. He took part in the 1990–1991 Togo protests that demanded multiparty politics. After the legalisation of multiparty democracy in 1991, he founded the Party of Democrats for Unity (PDU). He played a prominent role in the National Conference of July–August 1991 that established a transitional government.

In March 1993, the opposition coalition, meeting in Cotonou, Benin, proposed Savi de Tové as prime minister in place of Joseph Kokou Koffigoh, whom it criticised for cooperating with President Eyadéma. The nomination was rejected by the government. In 1994, he left the PDU, stood as an independent in the parliamentary elections, failed to win a seat, and subsequently rejoined the party.

In 1999, the PDU merged with other parties, including the UTD and UTS, to form the Pan-African Patriotic Convergence (CPP) under the leadership of Edem Kodjo; Savi de Tové was appointed its first vice-president.

In June 2005, he was appointed Minister of Trade, Industry and Handicrafts. He retained the portfolio in the government of Yawovi Agboyibo. On behalf of the CPP, he signed the political agreement that concluded the 2006 inter-Togolese dialogue. In the 2007 parliamentary election, he headed the CPP list in Zio Prefecture, but the party won no seats. He was dismissed from the government in December 2007. On 27 May 2009, he was appointed president of the Permanent Framework for Dialogue and Consultation (CPDC).

== Presidency (2025–present) ==
In May 2024, Togo adopted a new constitution that transformed the country from a presidential to a parliamentary system. Most powers previously exercised by the president were transferred to the renamed office of president of the Council of Ministers. The presidency itself became a largely ceremonial post, elected indirectly by Parliament for a four-year term renewable once.

The changes took effect in May 2025. On 3 May, Savi de Tové was unanimously elected president by Parliament meeting in congress. He was sworn in the same day, becoming the first president of the Fifth Republic and succeeding Faure Gnassingbé, who assumed the office of president of the Council of Ministers and thereby retained most executive power. Taking office four days before his 86th birthday, Savi de Tové is the oldest president in Togolese history.

== Honours ==
- Order of Mono – Commander (2006)

Political offices
Preceded by Faure Gnassingbé	President of Togo; 2025–present	Incumbent
