= COVID-19 pandemic in Togo =

Ongoing COVID-19 viral pandemic in Togo

- Disease: COVID-19
- Pathogen: SARS-CoV-2
- Location: Togo
- First outbreak: Wuhan, Hubei, China
- Index case: Lomé
- Arrival date: 6 March 2020 (6 years, 3 months and 2 days)
- Confirmed cases: 39,564 (updated 6 June 2026)
- Deaths: 290 (updated 6 June 2026)

The COVID-19 pandemic in Togo was a part of the ongoing worldwide pandemic of coronavirus disease 2019 (COVID-19) caused by severe acute respiratory syndrome coronavirus 2 (SARS-CoV-2). The virus was confirmed to have reached Togo in March 2020.

== Background ==
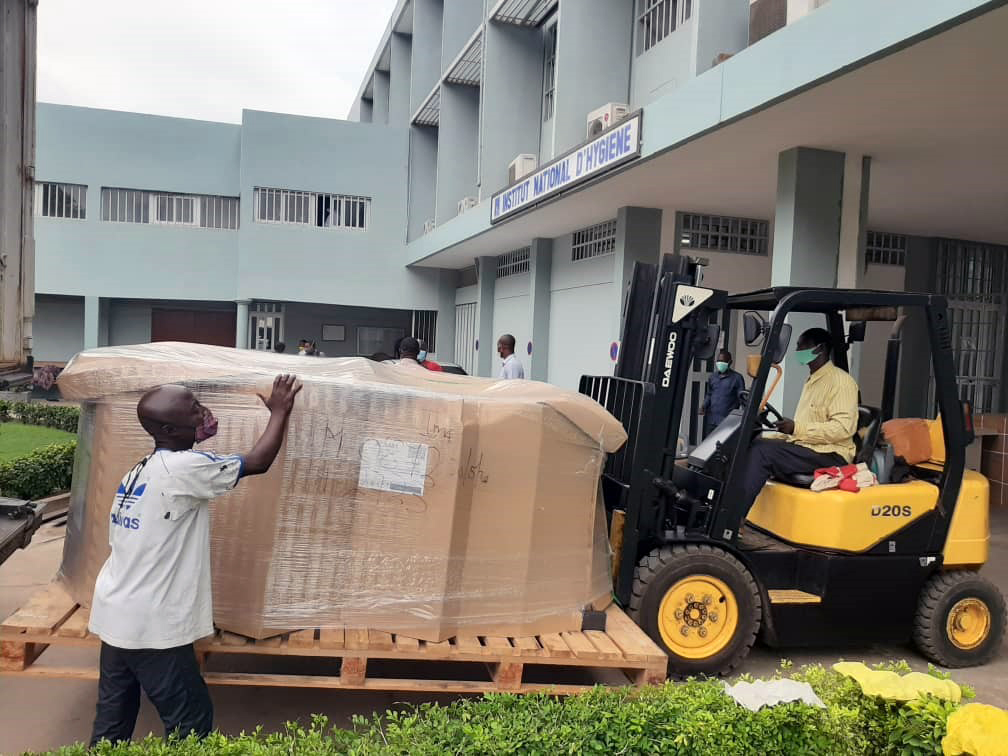
Tools to diagnose COVID-19 being delivered to the National Institute of Hygiene in Lomé, Togo

On 12 January 2020, the World Health Organization (WHO) confirmed that a novel coronavirus was the cause of a respiratory illness in a cluster of people in Wuhan City, Hubei Province, China, which was reported to the WHO on 31 December 2019.

The case fatality ratio for COVID-19 has been much lower than SARS of 2003, but the transmission has been significantly greater, with a significant total death toll.

In September 2021, Togo is extending the state of health emergency until September 2022 following the upsurge in new cases of coronavirus in recent weeks. Access to administrative buildings is now subject to presentation of a COVID-19 vaccine pass.

== Timeline ==
=== March 2020 ===
- On 6 March, Togolese authorities announced the first COVID-19 case, a 42-year-old Togolese woman who travelled between Germany, France, Turkey, and Benin before returning to Togo. On this date, it was reported that she was being treated in isolation and her condition was stable.
- On 20 March, nine more cases were confirmed in Togo. On this day, the first case recovered, as indicated by the Ministry of Health.
- On 21 March, seven more cases were confirmed. In an attempt to control the spread of the virus in Togo, all borders to the country were closed. The cities of Lomé, Tsévié, Kpalimé, and Sokodé were quarantined starting on 20 March for two weeks.
- On 27 March, the first death occurred.
- By the end of March there had been 34 confirmed cases, of which 1 patient had died and 10 had recovered, leaving 23 active cases.

=== Subsequent cases ===
- 2020 cases

There were 3,611 confirmed cases in 2020. 3,384 patients recovered while 68 persons died. At the end of 2020 there were 159 active cases.

- 2021 cases

Vaccinations started on 10 March, initially with 156,000 doses of AstraZeneca's Covishield vaccine delivered through the COVAX mechanism. Togo subsequently received 140,000 doses of the Oxford-AstraZeneca vaccine which the Democratic Republic of Congo had been unable to use before the expiry date.

Togo's first cases of the omicron variant were announced on 20 December.

There were 27,062 confirmed cases in 2021, bringing the total number of cases to 30,673. 22,783 patients recovered in 2021 while 180 persons died, bringing the total death toll to 248. At the end of 2021 there were 4,258 active cases.

Modelling by WHO's Regional Office for Africa suggests that due to under-reporting, the true number of infections by the end of 2021 was around 3.7 million while the true number of COVID-19 deaths was around one thousand.

- 2022 cases

There were 8,671 confirmed cases in 2022, bringing the total number of cases to 39,344. 12,881 patients recovered in 2022 while 42 persons died, bringing the total death toll to 290. At the end of 2022 there were 6 active cases.

- 2023 cases

There were 209 confirmed cases in 2023, bringing the total number of confirmed cases to 39,553. 214 patients recovered in 2023 while the death toll remained unchanged. At the end of 2023 there was one active case.

== Statistics ==
=== Confirmed new cases per day ===
View source data.

=== Confirmed deaths per day ===
View source data.

== Response ==
After an extraordinary council of ministers on 16 March, the government announced they would establish an XOF 2 billion fund to fight the pandemic. They also established the following measures: suspending flights from Spain, Italy, France, and Germany; canceling all international events for three weeks; requiring people who were recently in a high-risk country to self-isolate; closing their borders; and prohibiting events with more than 100 people effective 19 March. In accordance with the ban on large gatherings, on 18 March, the Togolese Football Federation suspended competitions. Other events were canceled too, including the FILBLEU literature festival.

Togo provided digital stimulus payments to almost a million residents.

== See also ==
- COVID-19 pandemic in Africa
- COVID-19 pandemic by country and territory
