= 2002 Togolese parliamentary election =

Parliamentary elections were held in Togo on 27 October 2002. Like the previous elections in 1999, they were boycotted by nine opposition parties (known as the Coalition of Democratic Forces), following the replacement of the Independent National Electoral Commission by a seven-magistrate committee and a revision of the Electoral Code. The result was a victory for the ruling Rally of the Togolese People, which won 72 of the 81 seats. Voter turnout was 67%.

== Results ==
Party	Votes	%	Seats	+/–
Rally of the Togolese People			72	–7
Rally for the Support of Democracy and Development			3	New
Juvento			2	New
Union for Democracy and Social Progress			2	New
Believers' Movement for Equality and Peace			1	New
Independents			1	–1
Total			81	0
Total votes	1,915,875	–		
Registered voters/turnout	2,841,079	67.43		
Source: African Elections Database
