= Senate of Togo =

Upper house of the Parliament of Togo

Senate of Togo Sénat du Togo

Type
- Type: Upper house of the Parliament of Togo

History
- Founded: March 2025

Leadership
- President: Barry Moussa Barqué, UNIR since 2 April 2025

Structure
- Seats: 61
- Political groups: UNIR (34); BATIR (2); ADDI (1); UFC (1); LTA (1); CLE (1); IND (1); Nominated (20)
- Length of term: 6 years

Elections
- Voting system: Indirect election (41 seats); Nomination by the prime minister (20 seats)

Meeting place
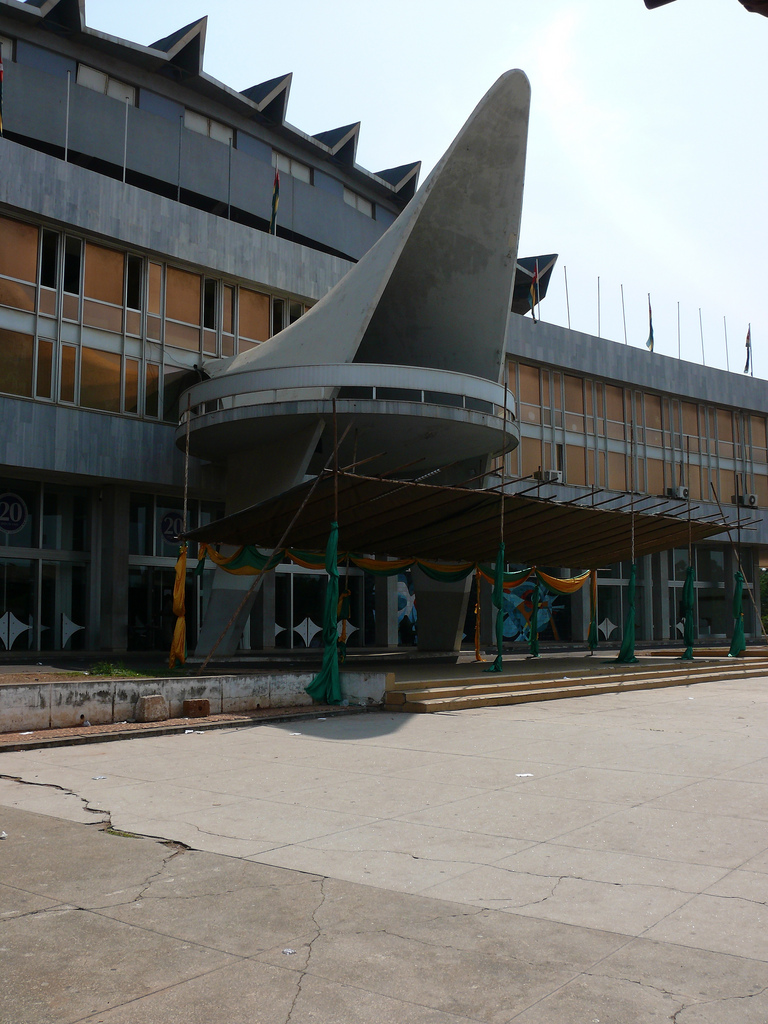
- Palais des Congrès, Lomé

The Senate (French: Sénat, [sena]) is one of the two chambers of the bicameral Togolese Parliament, the other being the National Assembly.

The resolution to establish the Senate was adopted by the National Assembly of Togo dominated by UNIR party on 8 May 2019. The first Senate session took place on 6 March 2025 in the Palais des Congrès in Lomé.

The Senate has 61 members. One-third of the members are named by the prime minister and the remainder two-thirds are elected indirectly by territories, ensuring additional representation for supporters of the prime minister and diluting the representation of his opponents. The members serve a six-year term.

== History ==
The 1992 constitution of Togo called for a Senate, which however was never formed until 2025.

== Presidents ==
President of the Senate	Period	Notes
Barry Moussa Barqué	2 Apr 2025 –	

== See also ==
- Politics of Togo
