= Victoire Tomegah Dogbé =

Prime Minister of Togo from 2020 to 2025

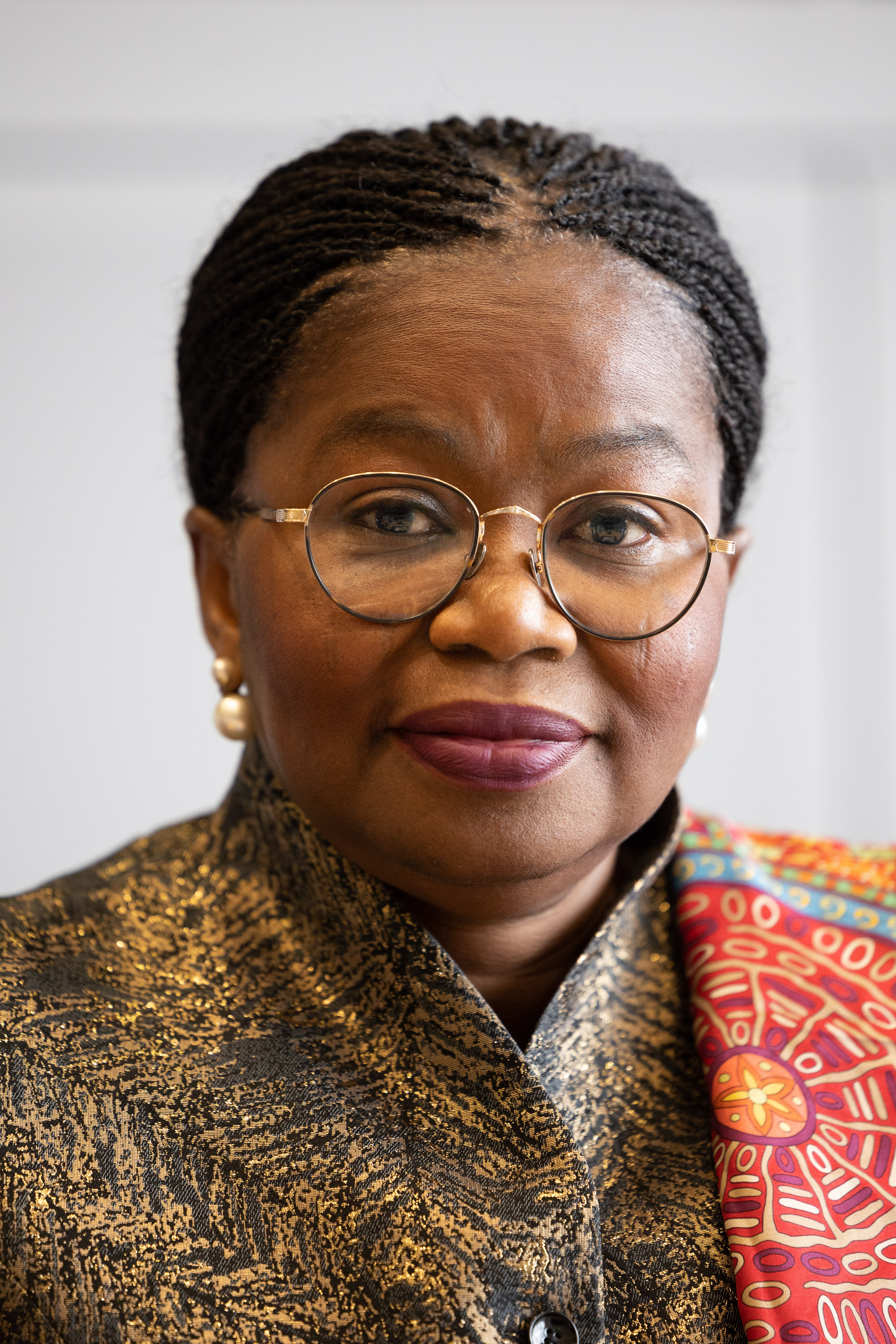
- Tomegah Dogbé in 2023

13th Prime Minister of Togo
- In office 28 September 2020 – 3 May 2025
- President: Faure Gnassingbé
- Preceded by: Komi Sélom Klassou
- Succeeded by: Office abolished Faure Gnassingbé (as President of the Council of Ministers)

Personal details
- Born: Victoire Sidémého Dzidudu Tomégah-Dogbé; 23 December 1959 (age 66) Lomé, Republic of Dahomey
- Party: Union for the Republic
- Occupation: Politician

Victoire Sidémého Dzidudu Tomégah-Dogbé (French pronunciation: [viktwaʁ sidemeo dzidudu tɔmeɡa dɔɡbe]; born 23 December 1959) is a Togolese politician who served as the 13th and final prime minister of Togo from 2020 to 2025, the first woman to hold the office. Previously, Tomegah Dogbé was the minister of Grassroots Development, Handicrafts, Youth and Youth Employment in the government of Komi Sélom Klassou and also the Cabinet Director of President Faure Gnassingbé.

== Career ==
In 2008, while she was at the United Nations Development Programme office in Benin, the President of the Republic Faure Essozimna Gnassingbé and the Prime Minister Gilbert Houngbo asked Tomégah Dogbé to manage the portfolio of Minister Delegate to the Prime Minister in charge of development at the base which had just been created in Togo.

In 2010, following the re-election of President Faure Gnassingbé, Tomegah Dogbé was appointed Minister of Grassroots Development, Youth Craft and Youth Employment in Gilbert Houngbo's second cabinet. She retained her ministerial functions in the first government of Kwesi Ahoomey-Zunu from 2012 to 2013 and his second government from 2013 to 2015. After the presidential election of April 2015, Komi Sélom Klassou replaced Ahoomey-Zunu as prime minister on 5 June 2015. Klassou formed his cabinet on 28 June 2015 in which Tomegah Dogbé still retained her respective ministry.

Tobegah Dogbé was named prime minister on 28 September 2020 by President Faure Gnassingbé after the resignation of Komi Sélom Klassou.

Political offices
Preceded by Komi Sélom Klassou	Prime Minister of Togo; 2020–2025	Succeeded by Faure Gnassingbé
