= Prime Minister of Togo =

Head of government

- Président du Conseil des Ministres (French)
- Emblem of Togo

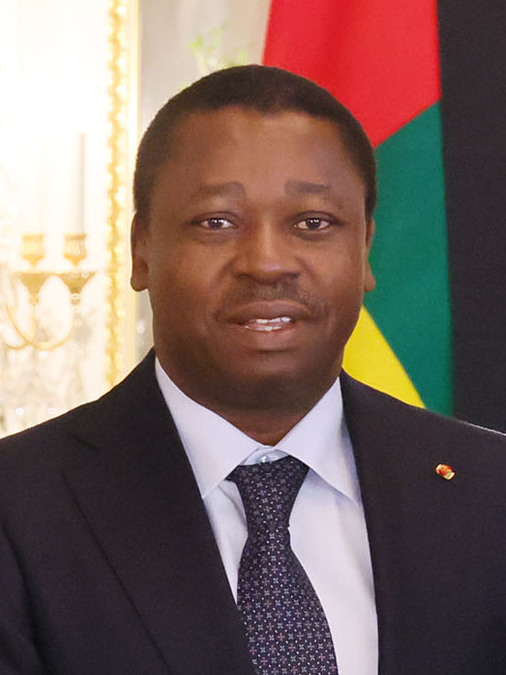
- Incumbent; Faure Gnassingbé since 3 May 2025
- Style: Prime Minister (informal); His Excellency (formal, diplomatic)
- Type: Head of government
- Member of: Council of Ministers; Parliament
- Reports to: President; Parliament
- Residence: Palace of the Governors
- Seat: Lomé
- Nominator: National Assembly
- Appointer: President; convention, based on appointee's ability to command confidence in the National Assembly
- Term length: At the pleasure of the president Six years, renewable indefinitely
- Constituting instrument: Constitution of Togo (2024)
- Formation: 27 April 1960 (as Prime Minister); 3 May 2025 (as President of the Council of Ministers)
- First holder: Sylvanus Olympio (as Prime Minister); Faure Gnassingbé (as President of the Council of Ministers)
- Unofficial names: Prime Minister of Togo
- Website: Official website

The prime minister of Togo (French: Premier ministre du Togo), officially the president of the Council of Ministers of the Togolese Republic (French: Président du Conseil des Ministres de la République togolaise), is the head of government of Togo. Most of the governing authority and executive powers lie in the president of the Council of Ministers, while the president of the Republic is a largely ceremonial role.

The prime minister is appointed by the president and can serve indefinite terms for up to six years; however, the prime minister may be removed by three-quarters majority of National Assembly members, who are directly elected every six years. A total of fourteen people have served as president of the Council of Ministers – thirteen men and one woman. Among them, one person, Edem Kodjo, has served on two non-consecutive occasions. The incumbent prime minister, Faure Gnassingbé, has served since 3 May 2025.

== History ==
=== 1991 conflict with the presidency ===
In the months following the appointment of Joseph Kokou Koffigoh as prime minister by the National Conference on 27 August 1991, the soldiers of the Togolese Armed Forces (FAT) loyal to President Gnassingbé Eyadéma repeatedly tried to oust Koffigoh:

- On 1 October 1991, the soldiers seized the national radio and television station and demanded that Koffigoh resign before leaving the station; Koffigoh said afterwards on the radio that order was restored.
- On 8 October 1991, the soldiers unsuccessfully tried to kidnap Koffigoh, and four people were reported killed in protests and violence that followed.
- In late November 1991, the soldiers began a siege of Koffigoh's official residence in Lomé after Eyadéma's party, the Rally of the Togolese People (RPT), was banned by the transitional High Council of the Republic (HCR). They demanded that Koffigoh's government be replaced and threatening to "reduce the city to ashes"; they also demanded that the RPT be legalized again and that the HCR be dissolved. Koffigoh called for French military aid. Eyadéma publicly called on the soldiers to return to their barracks and expressed continued trust in Koffigoh, but also invited him to begin consultations on the formation of a new national unity government. After two days of talks, the soldiers lifted their siege; however, they promptly resumed it. Koffigoh then offered to include supporters of Eyadéma in the government, but he refused to dissolve his government altogether, and he again called for French aid. On 3 December 1991, the soldiers succeeded in capturing Koffigoh in a heavy assault on his official residence, involving tanks and machine guns. Many people were killed in this violence: at least 17, and possibly more than 200. The soldiers then took Koffigoh to meet with Eyadéma, who was widely believed to have been behind the soldiers' actions, although he did not take responsibility for them. Later on the same day, Eyadéma released a statement saying that he and Koffigoh would form a new transitional government. Although Koffigoh remained in office, his power was considered curtailed. On 31 December, a new government headed by Koffigoh was announced, including three members of the RPT; most members of the previous government remained in their posts.

=== 2024 constitutional reform ===
In March 2024, President Faure Gnassingbé announced a new constitution. The proposed new constitution turned Togo from presidential system to a quasi-parliamentary system, weakening the powers of the president, strengthening the powers of the prime minister and renaming the office the President of the Council of Ministers, and as well as giving the new role a maximum term of six years. The new constitution was adopted in April 2024 after a vote in parliament and officially came into force the following month, thus creating the Fifth Republic.

The changes officially came into force on 3 May 2025, nearly one year after the new constitution came into force. Gnassingbé became the president of the Council of Ministers, effectively retaining most of the powers he had held as president. Opposition critics claimed the new constitution was intended to effectively make Gnassingbé Togo's leader for life. The presidency, now officially a ceremonial role, was handed over to Jean-Lucien Savi de Tové, a former opposition leader during the presidency of Gnassingbé's father. Savi de Tové was unanimously elected by the National Assembly and immediately sworn in president, became the oldest person to hold the office, aged nearly 86.

== Duties and competences ==
The president of the Republic appoints the prime minister. He terminates his functions.

The prime minister is the head of the Government. He directs the action of the Government and coordinates the functions of the other members. He presides over the Committees of Defense. He substitutes for, the case arising, the president of the Republic in the presidency of the Councils provided for in Articles 66 and 72 of this Constitution. He assures the interim of the head of the State in case of incapacity for cause of illness or of absence from the national territory.

Before his entry into office, the prime minister presents before the National Assembly the program of action of his Government.

The National Assembly accords its confidence to him by a vote with the absolute majority of its members.

The prime minister assures the execution of the laws.

He may delegate certain of his powers to the ministers.

The acts of the president of the Republic other than those provided for in Articles 4, 66, 68, 73, 74, 98, 100, 104 and 109 of this Constitution, are countersigned by the Prime Minister or, the case arising, by the Ministers given the charge of their execution.

== List of officeholders ==
Political parties

Party of Togolese Unity (PUT)
Coordination of New Forces (CFN)
Togolese Union for Democracy (UTD)
Rally of the Togolese People (RPT)
Pan-African Patriotic Convergence (CPP)
Action Committee for Renewal (CAR)
Union for the Republic (UNIR)

Other factions

Independent

No.	Portrait	Name (Birth–Death)	Term of office			Political party	Elected	Government	President(s)	Ref.
No.	Portrait	Name (Birth–Death)	Took office	Left office	Time in office	Political party	Elected	Government	President(s)	Ref.
Prime Minister (French: Premier ministre; 1960–2025)
1		Sylvanus Olympio (1902–1963)	27 April 1960	12 April 1961	350 days	Party of Togolese Unity	–	Olympio I	Himself	
Post abolished (12 April 1961 – 27 August 1991)
2		Joseph Kokou Koffigoh (born 1948)	27 August 1991	23 April 1994	2 years, 239 days	Coordination of New Forces	–	Koffigoh II	Eyadéma	
3		Edem Kodjo (1938–2020)	23 April 1994	20 August 1996	2 years, 119 days	Togolese Union for Democracy	1994	Kodjo I	Eyadéma	
3		Edem Kodjo (1938–2020)	23 April 1994	20 August 1996	2 years, 119 days	Togolese Union for Democracy	–	Kodjo II	Eyadéma	
4		Kwassi Klutse (1945–2024)	20 August 1996	21 May 1999	2 years, 274 days	Rally of the Togolese People	–	Klutse	Eyadéma	
5		Eugène Koffi Adoboli (1934–2025)	21 May 1999	31 August 2000	1 year, 102 days	Rally of the Togolese People	1999	Adoboli	Eyadéma	
6		Agbéyomé Kodjo (1954–2024)	31 August 2000	29 June 2002	1 year, 302 days	Rally of the Togolese People	–	A. Kodjo	Eyadéma	
7		Koffi Sama (born 1944)	29 June 2002	9 June 2005	2 years, 345 days	Rally of the Togolese People	2002	Sama I	Eyadéma	
7		Koffi Sama (born 1944)	29 June 2002	9 June 2005	2 years, 345 days	Rally of the Togolese People	–	Sama II	Gnassingbé	
7		Koffi Sama (born 1944)	29 June 2002	9 June 2005	2 years, 345 days	Rally of the Togolese People	–	Sama III	Abass	
7		Koffi Sama (born 1944)	29 June 2002	9 June 2005	2 years, 345 days	Rally of the Togolese People	–	Sama III	Gnassingbé	
(3)		Edem Kodjo (1938–2020)	9 June 2005	20 September 2006	1 year, 103 days	Pan-African Patriotic Convergence	–	Kodjo III	Gnassingbé	
8		Yawovi Agboyibo (1943–2020)	20 September 2006	6 December 2007	1 year, 77 days	Action Committee for Renewal	–	Agboyibo	Gnassingbé	
9		Komlan Mally (born 1960)	6 December 2007	8 September 2008	277 days	Rally of the Togolese People	2007	Mally	Gnassingbé	
10		Gilbert Houngbo (born 1961)	8 September 2008	23 July 2012	3 years, 319 days	Independent	–	Houngbo I	Gnassingbé	
10		Gilbert Houngbo (born 1961)	8 September 2008	23 July 2012	3 years, 319 days	Independent	–	Houngbo II	Gnassingbé	
11		Kwesi Ahoomey-Zunu (born 1958)	23 July 2012	10 June 2015	2 years, 322 days	Pan-African Patriotic Convergence (until 2013)	–	Ahoomey-Zunu I	Gnassingbé	
11		Kwesi Ahoomey-Zunu (born 1958)	23 July 2012	10 June 2015	2 years, 322 days	Union for the Republic	2013	Ahoomey-Zunu II	Gnassingbé	
12		Komi Sélom Klassou (born 1960)	10 June 2015	28 September 2020	5 years, 110 days	Union for the Republic	–	Klassou I	Gnassingbé	
12		Komi Sélom Klassou (born 1960)	10 June 2015	28 September 2020	5 years, 110 days	Union for the Republic	2018	Klassou II	Gnassingbé	
13		Victoire Tomegah Dogbé (born 1959)	28 September 2020	3 May 2025	4 years, 217 days	Union for the Republic	–	Dogbé I	Gnassingbé	
13		Victoire Tomegah Dogbé (born 1959)	28 September 2020	3 May 2025	4 years, 217 days	Union for the Republic	–	Dogbé II	Gnassingbé	
13		Victoire Tomegah Dogbé (born 1959)	28 September 2020	3 May 2025	4 years, 217 days	Union for the Republic	2024	Dogbé III	Gnassingbé	
President of the Council of Ministers (Président du Conseil; 2025–present)
14		Faure Gnassingbé (born 1966)	3 May 2025	Incumbent	1 year, 198 days	Union for the Republic	–	Gnassingbé	Savi de Tové	

== See also ==
- President of Togo
- List of colonial governors of Togo
- Politics of Togo
