= Faure Gnassingbé =

Leader of Togo since 2005

His Excellency Faure Gnassingbé
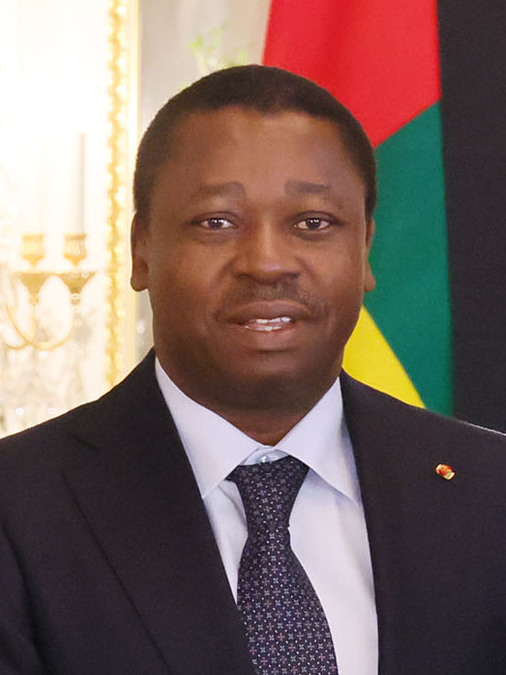
- Gnassingbé in 2022

1st President of the Council of Ministers of Togo
- Incumbent
- Assumed office 3 May 2025
- President: Jean-Lucien Savi de Tové
- Preceded by: Office established; Victoire Tomegah Dogbé (as Prime Minister)

4th President of Togo
- In office 4 May 2005 – 3 May 2025
- Prime Minister: See list: Koffi Sama Edem Kodjo Yawovi Agboyibo Komlan Mally Gilbert Houngbo Kwesi Ahoomey-Zunu Komi Sélom Klassou Victoire Tomegah Dogbé
- Preceded by: Bonfoh Abass (acting)
- Succeeded by: Jean-Lucien Savi de Tové
- In office 5 February 2005 – 25 February 2005
- Prime Minister: Koffi Sama
- Preceded by: Gnassingbé Eyadéma
- Succeeded by: Bonfoh Abass (acting)

10th President of the National Assembly of Togo
- In office 5 February 2005 – 25 February 2005
- Preceded by: Fambaré Ouattara Natchaba
- Succeeded by: Bonfoh Abass

Minister of Equipment, Mines, Posts, and Telecommunications
- In office 29 July 2003 – 5 February 2005
- Prime Minister: Koffi Sama

Personal details
- Born: 6 June 1966 (age 60) Afagnan, Togo
- Party: UNIR (since 2012)
- Other political affiliations: RPT (1990–2012)
- Spouse: Nana Ama Kuffour
- Relations: Gnassingbé Eyadéma (father); Kpatcha (half-brother)
- Education: Paris Dauphine University; George Washington (MBA)

Faure Essozimna Gnassingbé (French pronunciation: [fɔʁ esozimna ɲasiŋɡbe]; born 6 June 1966) is a Togolese politician who has led Togo since 2005, first as the fourth president until 2025 and then as president of the Council of Ministers. A member of the ruling Union for the Republic (UNIR), he is the son of the third president, Gnassingbé Eyadéma.

Born in Afagnan, Gnassingbé studied in the United States and France before joining the Rally of the Togolese People (RPT) in 1990. He was appointed by his father as Minister of Equipment, Mines, Posts, and Telecommunications, serving in these roles from 2003 to 2005. Following Eyadéma's death in 2005, Gnassingbé was immediately installed as president with support from the army and was elected president of the National Assembly to further legitimise his succession. However, doubts regarding the constitutional legitimacy of the succession led to heavy regional pressure being placed on Gnassingbé, and he subsequently resigned on 25 February. He then won a controversial presidential election on 24 April, and was sworn in as president. Gnassingbé further ran for three more terms in 2010, 2015 and 2020, after a 2019 constitutional amendment which allowed him to run for two more terms.

In 2024, Gnassingbé once again amended Togo's constitution, transferring most of the presidency's powers to the position of prime minister, which was officially reconstituted as "president of the Council of Ministers", nominally turning Togo from a presidential republic into a parliamentary one. The electoral process for the president was also changed, from being directly elected by the Togolese people to being indirectly elected by the Parliament. Opposition members criticised these changes due to the lack of term limits for Gnassingbé's new position. The changes came into effect in May 2025, when Gnassingbé was sworn in as president of the Council of Ministers, with former opposition leader Jean-Lucien Savi de Tové becoming president. Since June 2025, protests against Gnassingbé grew demanding his resignation. Gnassingbé has been widely criticized for contributing to democratic backsliding in Togo and critics have described him as a dictator.

== Early life and career ==
Born in Afagnan in Lacs Prefecture at the Hospital of the Brothers of the Order of Saint-Jean-de-Dieu d'Afagnan, Faure Essozimna Gnassingbé is of Kabye descent and is one of Gnassingbé Eyadéma's many children; his mother is Séna Sabine Mensah. Gnassingbé received his secondary education in Lomé before studying in Paris at the Université Paris-Dauphine, where he received a degree in financial business management; he subsequently obtained a Master of Business Administration degree from George Washington University in the United States. He was elected to the National Assembly of Togo in the October 2002 parliamentary election as a Deputy for Blitta, and in the National Assembly he was coordinator of the commission in charge of privatization. On 29 July 2003, he was appointed as Minister of Equipment, Mines, Posts, and Telecommunications, serving in that position until becoming president in February 2005.

Some in the opposition claimed that the amendment of the Constitution in December 2002, lowering the minimum age for the president from 45 years to 35 years, was intended to benefit Gnassingbé. His appointment to the government in July 2003 came after he had already been appearing with his father at official functions and contributed to speculation that he was intended as his father's successor.

== Presidency (2005–2025) ==
=== Assumption of power and legitimacy ===
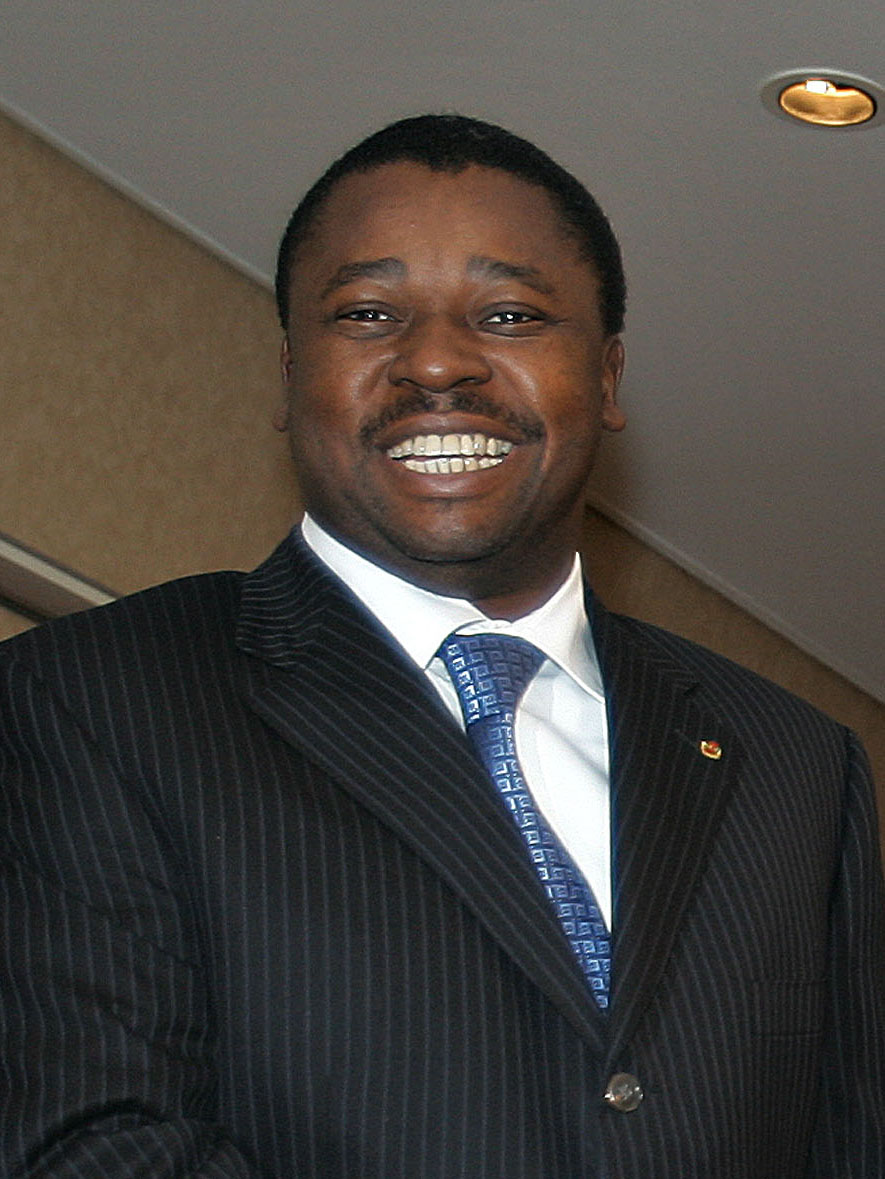
Gnassingbé in 2006

Eyadéma died suddenly on 5 February 2005. According to the Togolese Constitution, after the president's death, the president of the National Assembly should become acting president. At the time of Eyadéma's death, the National Assembly president Fambaré Ouattara Natchaba was out of the country, and Gnassingbé was thus sworn in as president by the Togolese Army to "ensure stability". Many believe that Natchaba did not want to come back to Togo due to fears of assassination by the Gnassingbé clan. The army wanted him to resign his position and allow Gnassingbé to legally take over. The African Union denounced Gnassingbé's assumption of power as a military coup.

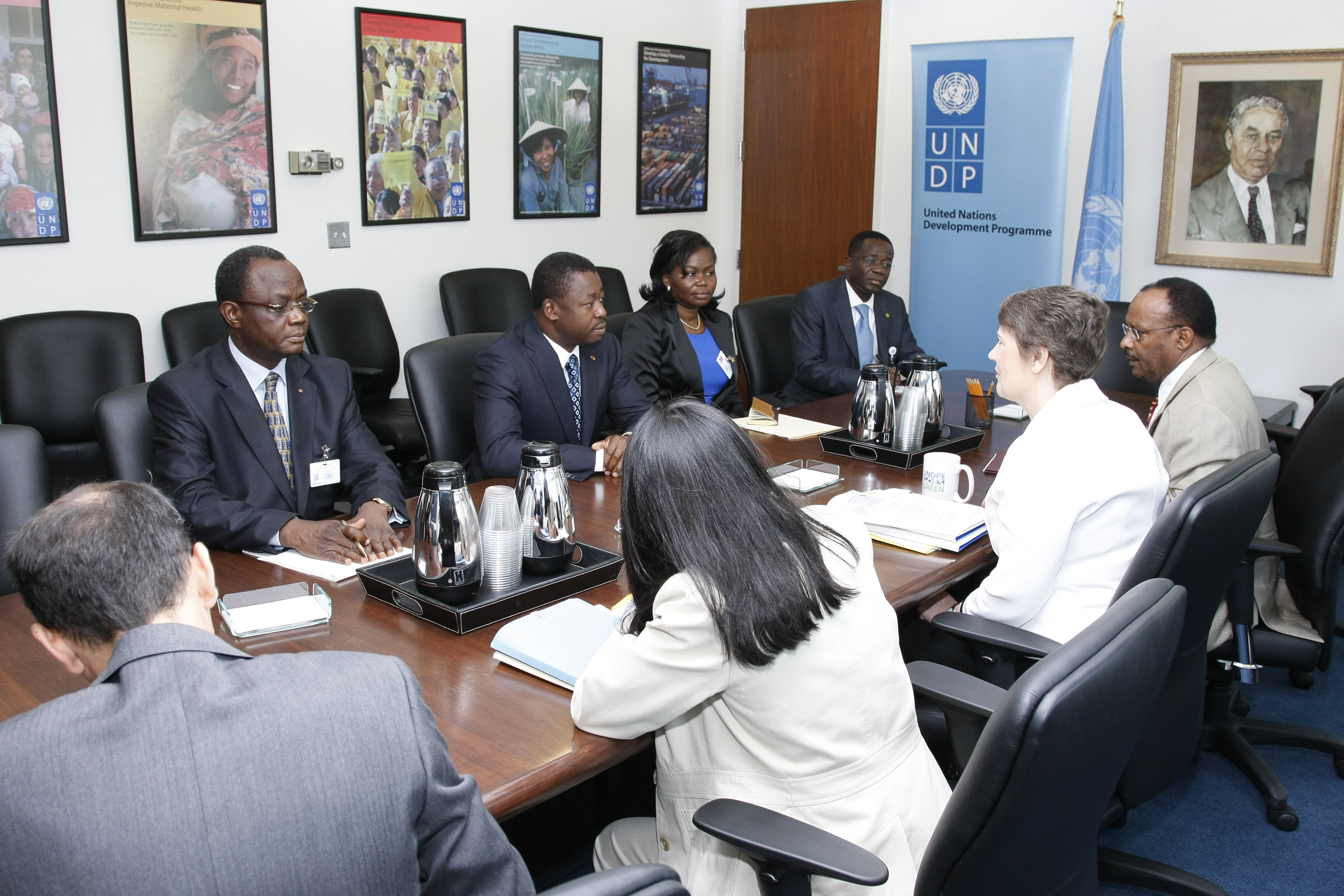
Helen Clark meeting with Gnassingbé in 2009

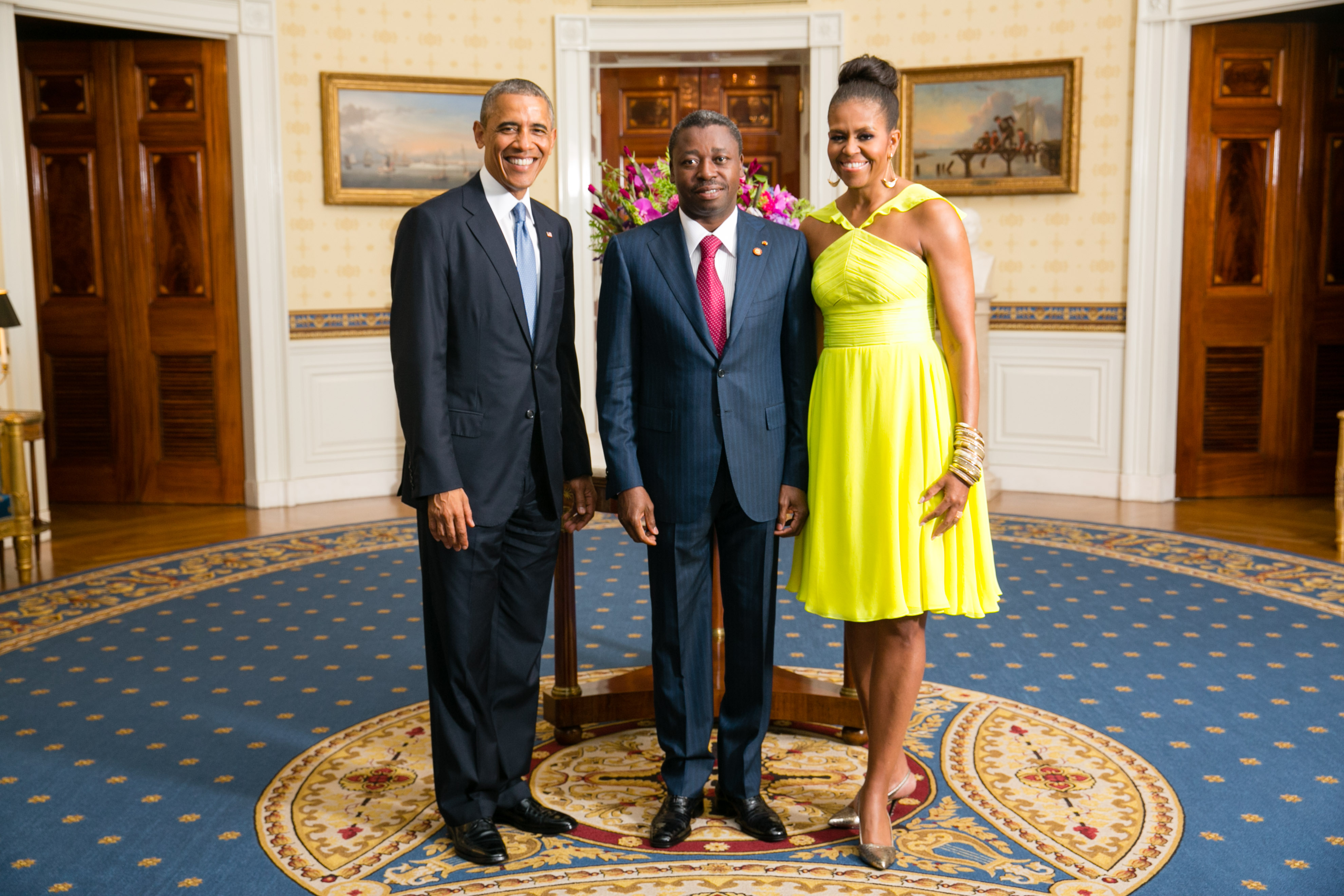
Gnassingbé with the Obamas in August 2014

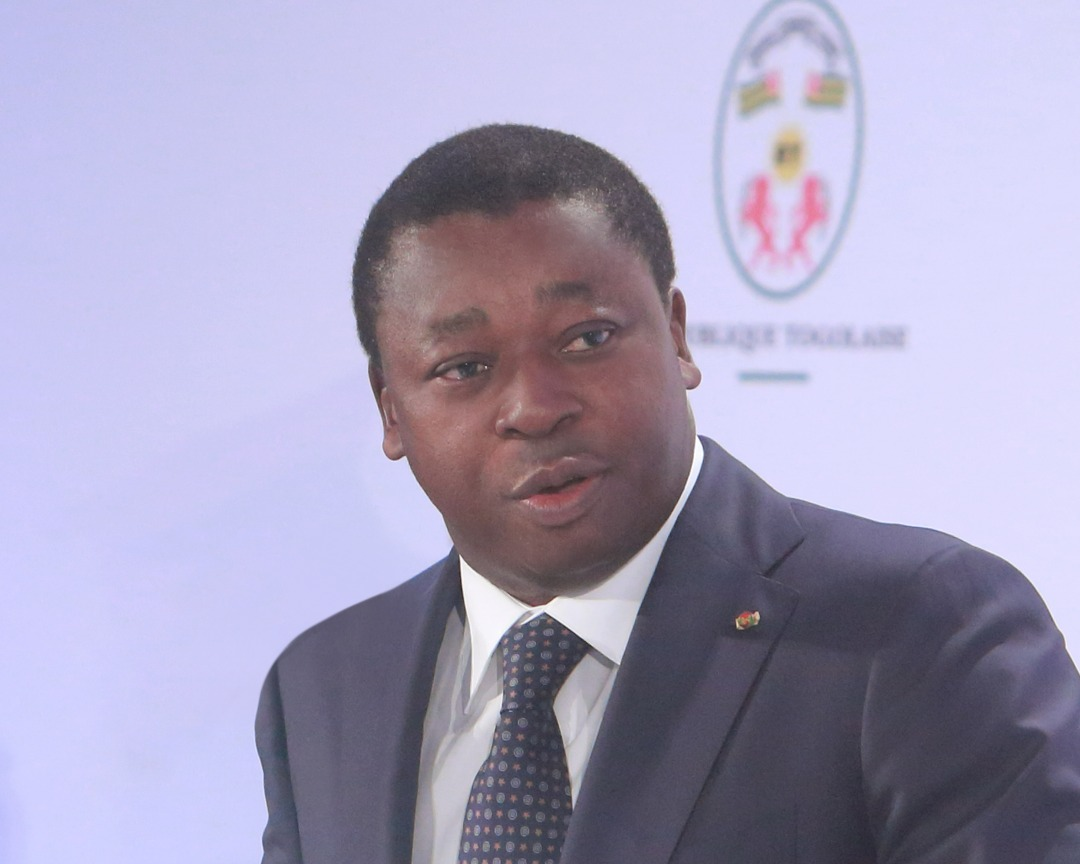
Gnassingbé at the launch of the National Development Plan (PND), March 2019

A day after his father's death, the National Assembly received clear instructions to dismiss Natchaba and elect Gnassingbé in his place, which would legalize his succession, which took place on 6 February 2005. Gnassingbé's election was unanimously approved by the deputies (98% of them were members of the ruling party) who were present in the National Assembly at the time; the opposition was not represented in the National Assembly due to its boycott of the 2002 parliamentary election. The members of Gnassingbé's then-party, the Rally of the Togolese People (RPT), did not want to challenge the army's choice. The parliament also eliminated a constitutional requirement that elections be held within 60 days of the president's death, enabling the younger Gnassingbé to rule until the expiration of his father's term in 2008.

Under pressure from others in the region, and particularly Nigeria, later that month 2005, Gnassingbé announced that new elections would be held within 60 days, but said that he would remain in office in the meantime. However, on 21 February, the National Assembly reversed some of the constitutional changes that it had made so as to allow Gnassingbé to assume power, although it did not instruct him to resign. This was construed as a way of pressuring him to stand down with dignity. To change the constitution during a period of transition was itself an unconstitutional act, but this did not deter Gnassingbé's allies.

On 25 February, Gnassingbé was nominated by delegates of the ruling party, the Rally for the Togolese People, as the party's presidential candidate. He was also chosen as head of the party. Shortly afterwards, under mounting domestic and international pressure, Gnassingbé announced that he would step down as president during the interim period and Bonfoh Abass was appointed by the National Assembly to replace him as acting president until the election on 24 April.

Bonfoh was considered by some to be a puppet of the military elite and the Gnassingbé family. Gnassingbé competed with the main opposition candidate, Emmanuel Bob-Akitani, a retired engineer of the state-owned mining company and the second most important person in the opposition coalition after Gilchrist Olympio. Olympio could not take part in the election, since the constitution required that any candidate must have lived for at least 12 months in Togo, and Olympio had been in self-imposed exile for fear that he would be murdered by the Eyadema clan like his father.

In the election, Gnassingbé received slightly more than 60% of the votes, according to official results. The RPT refused to allow oversight during the counting of the ballots. The EU and the Carter Center deemed the elections to be fraudulent. Mass protests by the coalition of opposition parties led to the killing of over 1,000 citizens by security forces. 40,000 refugees fled to neighboring Benin and Ghana.

=== Later elections ===
Gnassingbé was re-elected for a second term in 2010. In the April 2015 presidential election, Gnassingbé won a third term, defeating his main challenger, Jean-Pierre Fabre, by a margin of about 59% to 35%, according to official results. In the February 2020 presidential elections, Gnassingbé won his fourth presidential term in office as the president of Togo. According to the official result, he won with a margin of around 72% of the vote share. This enabled him to defeat his closest challenger, the former prime minister Agbeyome Kodjo who had 18%. The legitimacy of elections in Togo was widely disputed.

=== Corruption ===
The phosphates sector – accounting for 40% of export revenues – is managed at the office of the president, and Abdi Latif Dahir, based on the Panama Papers, stated that contracts and permits to manage the sector are sold to benefit the president.

=== Economic and fiscal policy ===
Since improving the economy of Togo, he has mobilized 12 billion 860 million CFA francs in order for construction of National No. 2. He also reconstructed the nations infrastructure by progressing steps with the Togblécopé and Amakpapé bridges being completed, which is why he had an agenda to develop the country in where he announced in Belgium.

=== Protests and term limit ===
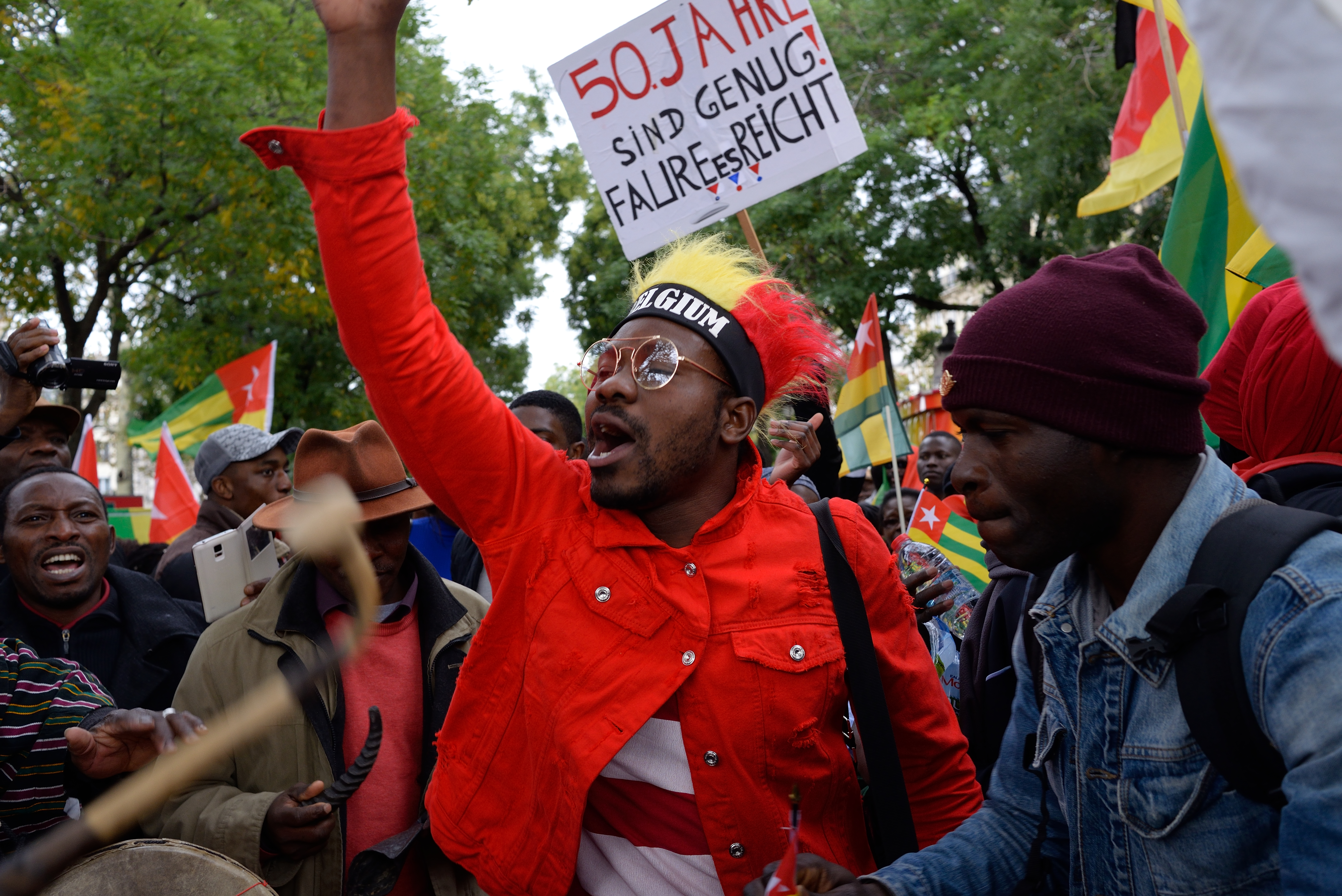
Anti-Gnassingbé protesters in Belgium

In 2019, the Parliament of Togo approved a new bill that allowed Gnassingbé to stay in office until 2030. Despite that, many protests took place in the streets calling for the end of the dynasty after ruling at the time for 52 years.

=== Foreign relations ===
On 18 June 2013, he met with Fra’ Matthew Festing, the Prince and Grand Master of the Sovereign Military Order of Malta, where they talked about humanitarianism, Gnassingbé's efforts to improve Togo's humanitarian contributions in his presidency.

In 2010, Prime Minister of Japan Yukio Hatoyama congratulated Gnassingbé for winning that year's presidential election. In 2023, Gnassingbé met Fumio Kishida in the Japan-Togo summit meeting where Kishida expressed his support for Gnassingbé for visiting the funeral of Shinzo Abe.

In 2025, Gnassingbé was selected as a mediator by the African Union to replace Angolan president João Lourenço in resolving the conflict in the Democratic Republic of the Congo.

== President of the Council of Ministers of Togo (2025–present) ==
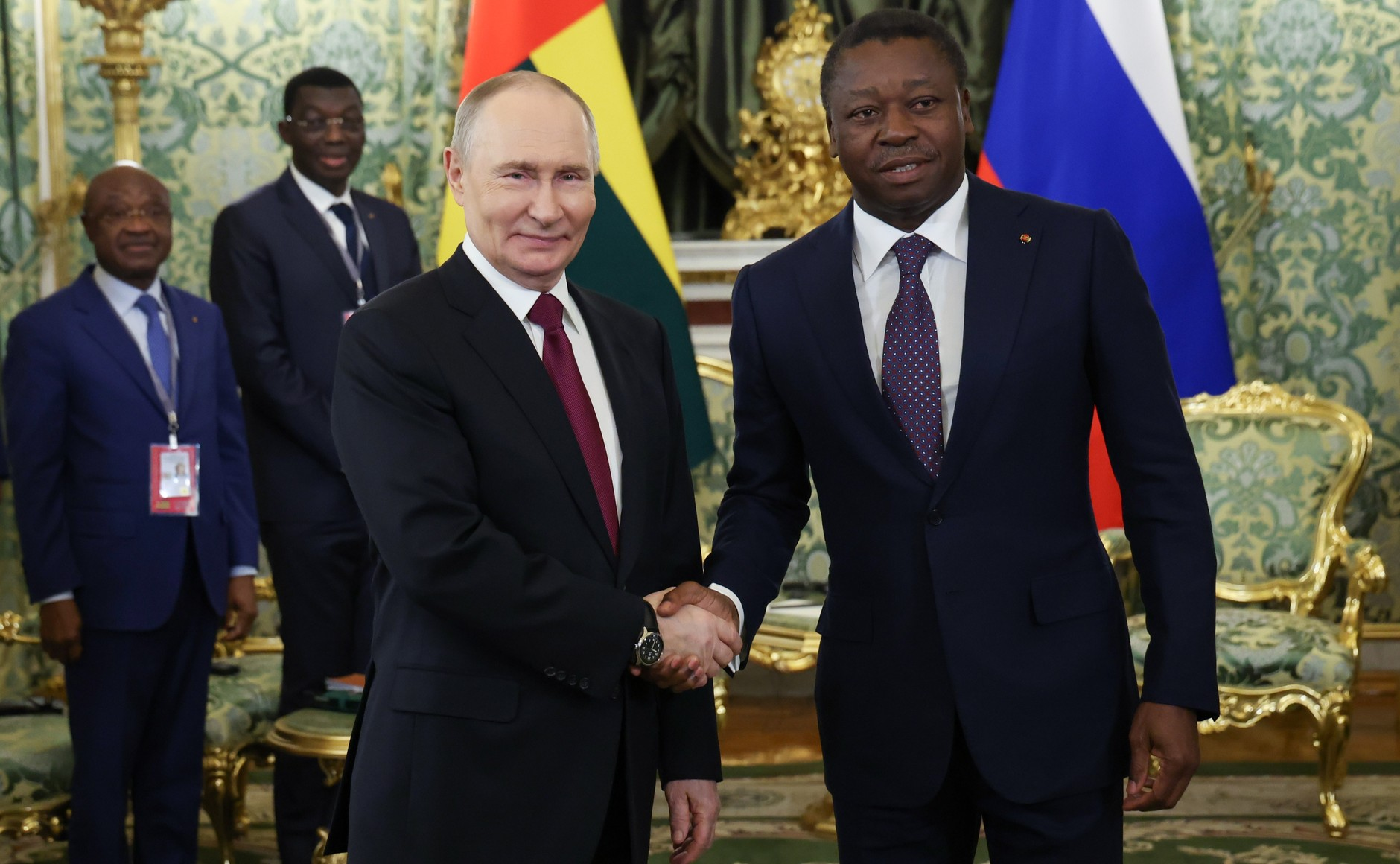
Gnassingbé with Russian President Vladimir Putin in Moscow on 19 November 2025

In 2024, Togo's parliament approved changes to the constitution which converted the country's presidential system to a parliamentary one, stripping off most of the powers of the presidency and making it a ceremonial role and as well as lowering the presidential term from five years to four with re-election permitted just once. The role of the prime minister was renamed President of the Council of Ministers, with most of the powers previously associated with the president being transferred to the role, thus making the President of the Council of Ministers the most powerful person in the country with the most governing authority. The new form of government was known as the Fifth Republic of Togo.

The new system took effect on 3 May 2025, where Gnassingbé was sworn in as President of the Council of Ministers, with Jean-Lucien Savi de Tové, a former opposition figure to Gnassingbé's father, being elected by the entire National Assembly and as well as 37 members of the Senate to succeed Gnassingbé as the country's first ceremonial president.

The reforms were criticized by the opposition as an attempt for Gnassingbé to remain in power, given the fact that the president of the Council of Ministers has no term limits. They also said that Gnassingbé transferred to this role in an attempt to keep his family's dominance over the country. In June 2025, shortly after Gnassingbé became president of the Council of Ministers, mass protests were held by youth leaders against Gnassingbé, calling for his resignation.

== See also ==
- History of Togo
- List of current heads of state and government
- List of heads of the executive by approval rating
- Politics of Togo

Political offices
| Preceded by Gnassingbé Eyadéma | President of Togo; 2005 | Succeeded by Bonfoh Abass; Acting |
| Preceded by Bonfoh Abass; Acting | President of Togo; 2005–2025 | Succeeded by Jean-Lucien Savi de Tové |
| Preceded by Victoire Tomegah Dogbé | Prime Minister of Togo; 2025–present | Incumbent |
