= Union for the Republic (Togo) =

Ruling political party of Togo

Union for the Republic Union pour la République
- Abbreviation: UNIR
- President: Faure Gnassingbé
- Founder: Faure Gnassingbé
- Founded: 2012; 14 years ago
- Preceded by: RPT
- Ideology: Authoritarian conservatism (Togolese); Conservatism; National conservatism Togolese nationalism Pragmatism; Neoliberalism; Pro-market economy Anti-communism
- Political position: Right-wing
- Colours: Blue
- Senate: 34 / 41 (83%)
- National Assembly: 108 / 113 (96%)

Website
- unir.tg

The Union for the Republic (UNIR; French: Union pour la République) is the ruling political party in Togo. The party emerged from the former Rally of the Togolese People (RPT), which was dissolved in 2012.

== Election results ==
=== Presidential elections ===
Election	Party candidate	Votes	%	Result
2015	Faure Gnassingbé	1,221,756	58.8%	Elected ✓
2020	Faure Gnassingbé	1,760,309	70.78%	Elected ✓

=== National Assembly elections ===
Election	Party leader	Votes	%	Seats	+/–	Position	Result
2013	Faure Gnassingbé	880,608	46.55%	62 / 91	▲42	▲1st	Supermajority government
2018	Faure Gnassingbé			59 / 91	▼3	1st	Majority government
2024	Faure Gnassingbé			108 / 113	▲49	1st	Supermajority government

=== Senate elections ===
Election	Party leader	Seats	+/–	Position
2025	Faure Gnassingbé	34 / 41	▲34	▲1st
