= Elections in Togo =

Elections in Togo take place within the framework of a presidential system. Both the President and the National Assembly are directly elected by voters. Togo is a one party dominant state with the Union for the Republic in power.

== Electoral history ==
Following World War II, the territory began to elect members to the French National Assembly. The first of these elections took place on 21 October 1945, with French Togoland and neighbouring Dahomey combined into a single constituency. Two MPs were elected using separate electoral colleges for French citizens and Africans. A by-election was held in February 1946 after the MP elected by the First College (French citizens) died in December 1945, with a second full election for the combined constituency held in June 1946. By the November 1946 elections, Togo had become a single-member seat, and Martin Aku of the Committee of Togolese Unity (CUT) was elected.

A Representative Council was established in the same period and was first elected in December 1946. The CUT emerged as the largest party, winning 14 of the 24 seats in the Second College. French National Assembly elections were held again in 1951, with the result being a reversal of the November 1946 elections, Nicolas Grunitzky of the Togolese Party of Progress (PTP) defeating Aku. Representative Assembly elections were held later in the year and saw the CUT reduced to a single seat, with the Union of Chiefs and Peoples of the North (UPCN) and its sister party the PTP winning 23 of the 24 Seconcd College seats. Due to political restructuring of the territory, a Territorial Assembly was created shortly afterwards and elections held in March 1952; the UPCN won half of the 30 seats, with the CUT–Juvento alliance winning nine and the PTP six.

In the 1955 elections the UPCN and PTP won 15 of the 30 seats each, with the CUT boycotting the vote. The following year Grunitzky ran unopposed for the French National Assembly seat. Parliamentary elections in 1958 led to a victory for the CUT, which won 29 of the 46 seats.

General elections were held in 1961, the first time the country's president had been directly elected. Sylvanus Olympio of the Party of Togolese Unity (PUT, the renamed CUT) was the only candidate, whilst the PUT was the only party to put forward candidates in the National Assembly election, winning all 52 seats. Following a coup in 1963 that ousted Olympio, early general elections were held, with Grunitzky as the sole presidential candidate. Four parties (the PUT, Juvento, the Democratic Union of the Togolese People and the Togolese People's Movement) ran unopposed on a combined list for the National Assembly elections, each taking 14 of the 56 seats.

Following another coup by Gnassingbé Eyadéma in 1967, elections were not held again until 1979 and the country became a one-party state under the Rally of the Togolese People (RPT); General elections that year saw Eyadéma re-elected unopposed as President and the RPT win all the National Assembly seats. Parliamentary elections were held under this system in 1985 and 1990, with Eyadéma re-elected as President in 1986.

Mulit-party democracy was reintroduced in 1992 and presidential elections held in 1993. A boycott by the two main opposition parties saw Eyadéme re-elected with 96.5% of the vote. Although parliamentary elections the following year saw the RPT defeated by the Action Committee for Renewal (CAR), Eyadéma refused to appoint CAR leader Yawovi Agboyibo as Prime Minister, instead giving the post to Edem Kodjo, leader of the CAR's junior ally, the Togolese Union for Democracy; this caused a split in the coalition, and the RPT joined the government in their place.

Eyadéma was re-elected again in 1998 with 52% of the vote and the RPT won 79 of the 81 seats in the National Assembly in parliamentary elections the following year amidst a boycott by eight opposition parties. The party retained its majority in the 2002 elections, which were boycotted by nine parties, and Eyadéma was re-elected for a fifth time in the 2003 presidential elections with 58% of the vote.

Following Eyadéma's death in 2005, early presidential elections were held in the same year, and were won by his son Faure Gnassingbé, who received 60% of the vote. The RPT subsequently won 50 of the 81 seats in the 2007 parliamentary elections. Gnassingbé was re-elected in 2010 with 61% of the vote. In 2012 he dissolved the RPT, replacing it with the Union for the Republic (UNIR). UNIR went on to win 62 of the 91 seats in the 2013 parliamentary elections. Gnassibngé was re-elected again in 2015 with 59% of the vote.

== Electoral system ==
=== President ===
The President of Togo is elected by plurality voting.

=== National Assembly ===
The 91 members of the National Assembly are elected by closed list proportional representation in 30 multi-member constituencies of between two and ten seats; seats are allocated using the highest averages method and there is no electoral threshold. Parties must submit lists with double the number of candidates for the number of seats being contested in order to provide replacements.

== Referendums ==
During the colonial era, voters participated in French constitutional referendums in 1945, May 1946, October 1946 and 1958. Unlike in other French territories, voting in the 1958 referendum was restricted to French citizens only.

A referendum on remaining a United Nations Trust Territory or becoming an autonomous region within the French Union was held in 1956 and resulted in a large majority in favour of the French option. However, the results were rejected by the United Nations General Assembly as the referendum had not included the option of independence and opted to continue with the trusteeship.

A 1961 referendum approved constitutional amendments allowing for direct elections for the president and the creation of a presidential republic. Further constitutional amendments were approved in a 1963 referendum following the coup.

In 1972 a referendum was held on whether 1967 coup leader Eyadéma should remain in power, and was approved by 99.9% of voters. Constitutional amendments approved in a 1979 referendum made the country a one-party state. This was reversed by changes approved in a 1992 referendum.
