= 1963 Togolese general election =

1963 Togolese presidential election
← 1961	5 May 1963	1979 →
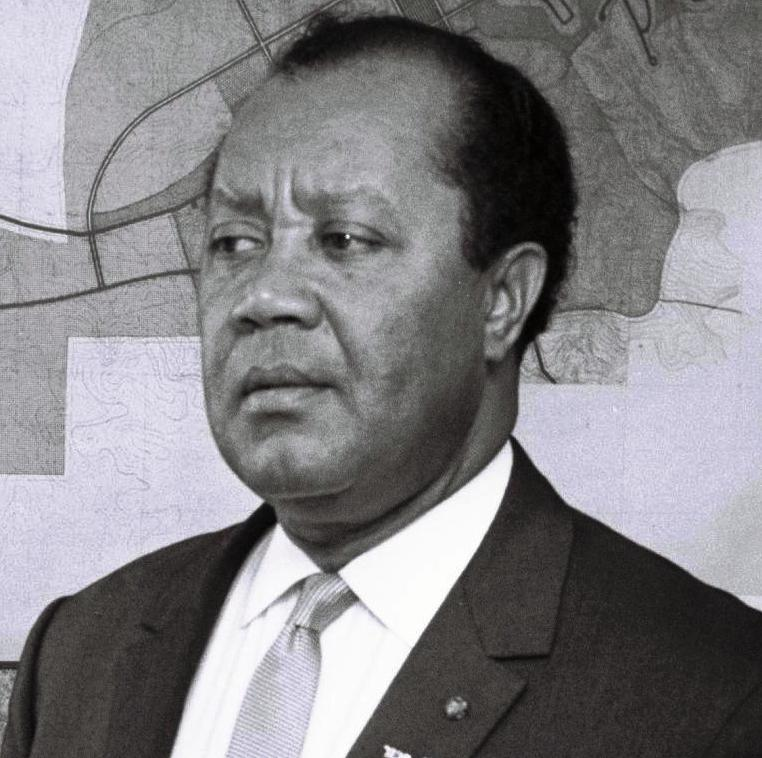
Nominee	Nicolas Grunitzky
Party	MPT
Popular vote	568,893
Percentage	100%
President before election
Emmanuel Bodjollé
Military
Elected President
Nicolas Grunitzky
PTP

General elections were held in Togo on 5 May 1963, alongside a constitutional referendum. It followed a military coup earlier in the year which had ousted (and killed) President Sylvanus Olympio, who had dissolved all political parties except his own Party of Togolese Unity in 1961. Nicolas Grunitzky, who had served as Prime Minister since shortly after the coup was elected president unopposed. Antoine Meatchi was elected as vice president. In the National Assembly election, a single list of candidates containing members of the Party of Togolese Unity, Juvento, the Democratic Union of the Togolese People and the Togolese People's Movement (all of which had 14 seats) was put forward under the name "Reconciliation and National Union". It was approved by 99% of voters. Voter turnout was 91%.

== Results ==
=== President ===
Candidate	Party	Votes	%
Nicolas Grunitzky	Togolese People's Movement	568,893	100.00
Total		568,893	100.00
Valid votes		568,893	97.70
Invalid/blank votes		13,416	2.30
Total votes		582,309	100.00
Registered voters/turnout		639,524	91.05
Source: Nohlen et al.

=== National Assembly ===
Party	Votes	%	Seats
Reconciliation and National Union	568,893	98.61	56
Against	7,993	1.39	–
Total	576,886	100.00	56
Valid votes	576,886	99.07	
Invalid/blank votes	5,423	0.93	
Total votes	582,309	100.00	
Registered voters/turnout	639,524	91.05	
Source: Nohlen et al.
