= Democratic Union of the Togolese People =

Political party in Togo (1959–1967)

Democratic Union of the Togolese People Union Démocratique des Populations Togolaises
- Abbreviation: PTP
- Leader: Nicolas Grunitzky
- Founded: October 1959
- Dissolved: 1967
- Merger of: Togolese Party of Progress; Union of Chiefs and Peoples of the North

The Democratic Union of the Togolese People (French: Union Démocratique des Populations Togolaises, UDPT) was a political party in Togo.

== History ==
The party was established in October 1959 by a merger of the Togolese Party of Progress and the Union of Chiefs and Peoples of the North, which together had won 13 of the 46 seats in the 1958 parliamentary elections. However, it was disqualified from competing in the 1961 elections, which saw the Party of Togolese Unity (PUT) win the presidency and all seats in the National Assembly.

After PUT President Sylvanus Olympio was overthrown in a 1963 coup, fresh elections were held in the same year. The UDPT and three other parties formed a joint list of candidates for the National Assembly election, with each party awarded 14 seats.

However, following another coup in 1967, the party was dissolved.
