= Alex Mivedor =

Togolese politician (1927–2012)

Mivedor in 1972

Alex Ayité Gachin Mivedor (2 March 1927 – 18 January 2012) was a Togolese engineer and politician. He held ministerial government positions, and was often seen as the civilian number two in the government of Gnassingbé Eyadema.

== Biography ==
Mivedor was born in Aného, French Dahomey, on 2 March 1927. He belonged to a Mina family. He studied in Bamako between 1943 and 1947, and then in Toulouse and Paris between 1947 and 1955, graduating as a hydraulic and electrical engineer. After his graduation he returned to Bamako where he worked for the public water services. During his 1956–1958 stay in Bamako he joined the radical youth movement, and he was elected general secretary of the Youth Council of Soudan at its first congress 9–11 June 1957. In 1958 he returned to Togo where he was named head of the Division of Electrical and Water Services of the Ministry of Public Works (a post he would hold until 1966).

Politically he belonged to Juvento and the Committees for Togolese Unity (CUT) movements. Mivedor was one of the leaders of the failed 21 November 1966 coup attempt, and was exiled afterwards. Following the January 1967 coup d'état, Mivedor became one of eight members of the Togolese Committee for National Reconciliation led by Lt.-Col. Gnassingbé Eyadema, being in charge of Public Works and Rural Economy in the new regime. At the time of the announcement of the new government Mivedor was still in exile in Bamako. In April 1967 he was named Minister of Mines, Energy and Hydraulic Resources. He would serve as Minister of Public Works, Mines, Transportations, Posts and Telecommunications. He was named Permanent Deputy Director of the Political Bureau of the ruling Rally for the Togolese People (RPT) party. Mivedor was removed from the ministerial cabinet until 1979. He was purged from his RPT posts in January 1983. His house was burnt down by protestors in the 1991 upheavals demanding a National Conference.

Mivedor died in Paris on 18 January 2012 at the age of 85. He was buried in Aného. Participants at a commemoration service in the capital included Head of State Faure Gnassingbé, Prime Minister Gilbert Fossoun Houngbo, Speaker of the National Assembly Bonfoh Abass and other political leaders.
