= Dina Grunitzky =

First lady of Togo and wife of Sylvanus Olympio (1903-1964)

1st First Lady of Togo
- In role 15 April 1961 – 13 January 1963
- President: Sylvanus Olympio
- Preceded by: Position created
- Succeeded by: Vinolia Baeta

Personal details
- Born: Dina Grunitzky; 1903
- Died: 1964 (aged 60–61)
- Party: Party of Togolese Unity
- Spouse: Sylvanus Olympio (m. 1930; died 1963)
- Relations: Nicolas Grunitzky (half-brother)
- Children: Five, inc. Gilchrist Olympio

Dina Grunitzky (1903–1964) was the wife of the first president of Togo Sylvanus Olympio. She was the first First Lady of the Republic of Togo from 15 April 1961 to 13 January 1963, when her husband was assassinated during the 1963 Togolese coup d'état.

== Biography ==
Grunitzky was born in 1903. Her father was Harry Grunitzky, a German officer of Polish origin and Hodjinga who is Anlo Ewe from Keta. She was the sister of the two years older Felix and her half-brother was Nicholas Grunitzky, who was a Togolese statesman and the second president of the Republic of Togo.

In December 1930 (according to other sources 1931), she married Sylvanus Olympio. The couple had five children; Kwassi Bonito Herbert who died on 25 August 1994, Ablavi Rosita, Kwami Gilchrist Sylvanus, Ayaba Sylvana and Kodzo Elpidio Fernando.
