= 1951 French legislative election in Togo =

Elections to the French National Assembly were held in French Togoland on 17 June 1951 as part of the wider French elections. Nicolas Grunitzky of the Togolese Party of Progress was elected with 61% of the vote, defeating the incumbent Martin Aku. The result was a reversal of the November 1946 election, in which Aku defeated Grunitzky.

== Results ==
| Candidate | Party | Votes | % |
|---|---|---|---|
| Nicolas Grunitzky | Togolese Party of Progress | 16,255 | 61.29 |
| Martin Aku | Committee of Togolese Unity | 10,268 | 38.71 |
| Total | | 26,523 | 100.00 |
| Valid votes | | 26,523 | 98.82 |
| Invalid/blank votes | | 317 | 1.18 |
| Total votes | | 26,840 | 100.00 |
| Registered voters/turnout | | 32,496 | 82.59 |
Source: Sternberger et al.
