= November 1946 French legislative election in Togo =

Elections to the French National Assembly were held in French Togoland on 10 November 1946 as part of the wider French elections. Previously, Togoland had formed a single constituency with neighbouring Dahomey, but the new 1946 constitution had separated the two territories, giving Togoland one seat in the Assembly. It was won by Martin Aku of the Committee of Togolese Unity, who received 34% of the vote.

== Results ==
Candidate	Party	Votes	%
Martin Aku	Committee of Togolese Unity	4,726	74.27
Nicolas Grunitzky	Togolese Party of Progress	1,637	25.73
Total		6,363	100.00
Valid votes		6,363	98.26
Invalid/blank votes		113	1.74
Total votes		6,476	100.00
Registered voters/turnout		9,571	67.66
Source: Sternberger et al.
