= Pya-Hodo Massacre =

French Colonial Army mass killing in Kozah, Togo

Pya-Hodo massacre
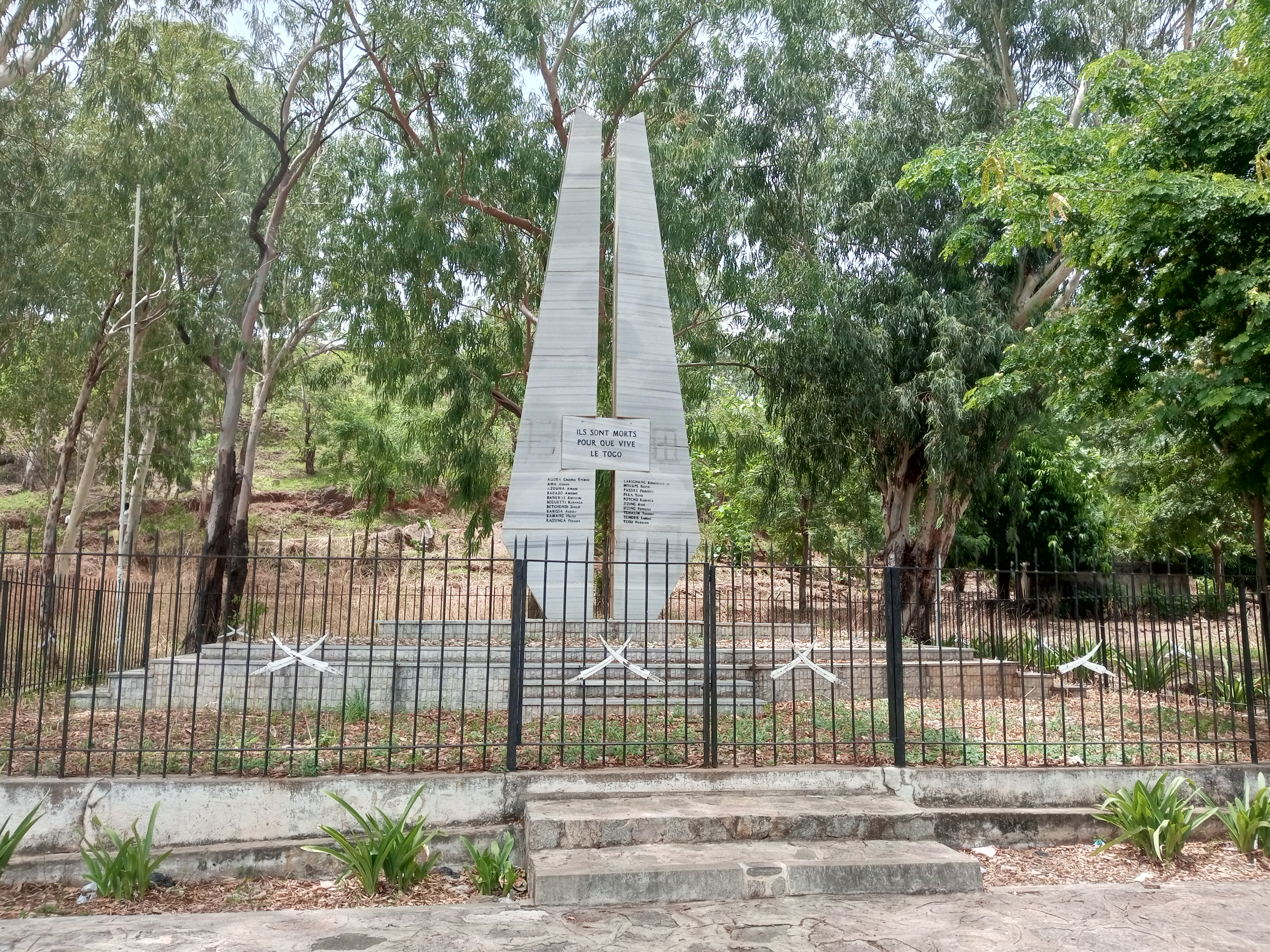
- Monument dedicated to the victims of the massacre
- Location: Pya-Hodo, Kozah Prefecture, French Togoland
- Date: 21 June 1957
- Attack type: Massacre of civilians dissatisfied with the colonial administration
- Deaths: 20
- Injuries: few dozens
- Perpetrator: French Colonial Army

The Pya-Hodo Massacre (French: Le massacre de Pya-Hodo) in Togo refers to a massacre that took place on 21 June 1957. On that day, a UN delegation visited the country, in Pya-Hodo (in Kozah). The population took advantage of the visit of the United Nations mission, led by Charles T. O. King, Permanent Representative of Liberia to the United Nations, to express its frustration with the French colonial administration in Togo which was imposed on the country.

Faced with the anger of the demonstrators, protesting against the arrest of the Togolese nationalist, Bouyo Moukpé, the colonial army fired on the crowd that frequented the Hoda market, killing 20 and injuring many. The mission had no other means than to deplore the incident linked to the political situation of the time, which it described as ″tense, bitter and deadly″.

The separatists opposed the application of the framework law of 23 June 1956 known as the “Loi-cadre Defferre”. Togo was not a colony but a territory entrusted by the UN to France. After this tragedy, it was forced to organize elections under the supervision of UN emissaries. However, independence was not obtained until April 27, 1960.

== Memory ==
During the one-party rule of the Rally of the Togolese People, a marble stele was erected, listing the names of the deceased with the epitaph "They died so that Togo may live". The massacre is commemorated as a Martyrs' Day in Togo on each 21 June, becoming a public holiday in 2021. It commemorates all the dead of the struggle for independence, not only the victims of the Pya-Hodo massacre. In this locality of Kabiyè country a white marble stele was erected. It is written there: “They died so that Togo may live”. The monument also mentions the names of the twenty victims of this massacre.
