= 1946 French Togoland Representative Assembly election =

Representative Assembly elections were held in French Togoland on 8 December 1946.

== Background ==
The Representative Assembly had been created by decree on 25 October 1946 in line with Article 77 of the French constitution.

== Electoral system ==
The 30 members of the Representative Assembly were elected by two colleges; the first college consisted of French citizens and elected six seats, whilst the second college (non-citizens) elected 24.

== Results ==
Party	Votes	%	Seats
First College
			6
Second College
Committee of Togolese Unity			14
Togolese Party of Progress			1
Independents			9
Total			30
Source: Afrology

=== Elected members ===
Nicolas Grunitzky was the sole elected member for the Togolese Party of Progress.

== Aftermath ==
Following the elections, Sylvanus Olympio was elected President of the Assembly. On 23 December the Assembly elected Jonathan Savi de Tové as Togoland's member of the French Union Council.
