= Kozah =

Kozah could refer to:

- Kozah Prefecture in Togo
- Talos, a fictional deity in Dungeons & Dragons
