= Togolese People's Movement =

Togolese People's Movement Mouvement Populaire Togolais
- Abbreviation: MPT
- Leader: Nicolas Grunitzky
- Founded: 16 August 1954
- Dissolved: 1967
- Split from: Togolese Party of Progress

The Togolese People's Movement (French: Mouvement Populaire Togolais, MPT) was a political party in Togo between 1954 and 1967.

== History ==
The party was established on 16 August 1954 following a split in the Togolese Party of Progress over the sacking of John Atayi. The MPT received 1.4% of the vote in the 1955 Territorial Assembly elections, failing to win a seat. Its vote share fell to 0.3% in the 1958 elections, again failing to win a seat.

Following the 1963 coup, the MPT was one of four to form the Reconciliation and National Union, a single electoral list to contest the elections later that year, with each party holding 14 seats. Its leader Nicolas Grunitzky was the sole presidential candidate.

However, following another coup in 1967, the party was dissolved.

== Electoral history ==
=== Presidential elections ===
Date	Candidate	Votes	%	Result
1963	Nicolas Grunitzky	568,893	100%	Elected ✓

=== National Assembly elections ===
Election	Leader	Votes	%	Seats	+/–
1955	Nicolas Grunitzky	2,089	1.4%	0 / 30	Steady
1958	Nicolas Grunitzky	842	0.3%	0 / 46	Steady
1963	Nicolas Grunitzky	568,893 (Note: As part of the Reconciliation and National Union.)	98.6%	14 / 56	▲14
