= Togolese Republic (disambiguation) =

Togolese Republic is a sobriquet for Togo.

Togolese Republic may also refer to:

- First Togolese Republic
- Second Togolese Republic
- Third Togolese Republic
- Fourth Togolese Republic
- Fifth Togolese Republic
