= 1979 Togolese constitutional referendum =

- 30 December 1979
- Do you approve of the draft constitution proposed by the extraordinary congress of the Rally of the Togolese People?

Results
Choice	Votes	%
Yes	1,293,872	99.87%
No	1,693	0.13%
Valid votes	1,295,565	100.00%
Invalid or blank votes	44	0.00%
Total votes	1,295,609	100.00%
Registered voters/turnout	1,303,970	99.36%

A constitutional referendum was held in Togo on 30 December 1979, alongside simultaneous general elections. The changes to the constitution would establish the Third Togolese Republic and make the country a presidential republic and a one-party state, and were approved by 99.87% of voters with a 99.4% turnout. The constitution came into force on 12 January 1980.

== Background ==
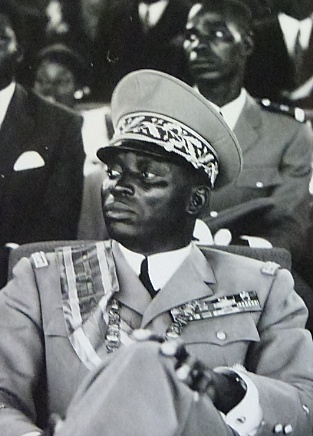
Gnassingbé in 1972.

The referendum took place simultaneously with legislative and presidential elections, the first to take place in the country since Gnassingbé Eyadéma's coup in 1967. Following the coup, the National Assembly was dissolved and 1963 constitution abolished.

On 30 August 1969 Eyadéma founded the Rally of the Togolese People (French: Rassemblement du Peuple Togolais, RPT), a de facto single party. His position as president of Togo was confirmed during a 1972 plebiscite. The 1979 elections saw him retain the presidency unopposed with the RPT winning all the seats in the National Assembly.

== Aims ==
The new constitution provided for a strong presidential system and officially made the country a one-party state. Article 10 stated that "The RPT, single party [...] expresses the aspirations of the working masses. [...] The Togolese political system is based on the single-party system." (Note: French: "Le RPT, parti unique (...) exprime les aspirations des masses laborieuses. (...) Le système politique togolais repose sur le principe du parti unique") The president can call for referendums (Article 2), which are mandatory for constitutional matters if the parliament doesn't approve a law by a two-thirds majority (Article 52).

== Results ==
Voters voted using ballots colored red for "yes" and white for "no". In many polling stations, neither white "no" ballots nor voting booths were present.

Choice	Votes	%
For	1,293,872	99.87
Against	1,693	0.13
Total	1,295,565	100.00
Valid votes	1,295,565	100.00
Invalid/blank votes	44	0.00
Total votes	1,295,609	100.00
Registered voters/turnout	1,303,970	99.36
Source: Direct Democracy
