= 1956 French legislative election in Togo =

Elections to the French National Assembly were held in French Togoland on 2 January 1956 as part of the wider French elections. Nicolas Grunitzky of the Togolese Party of Progress was elected unopposed.

== Results ==
Candidate	Party	Votes	%
Nicolas Grunitzky	Togolese Party of Progress	184,240	100.00
Total		184,240	100.00
Valid votes		184,240	99.19
Invalid/blank votes		1,509	0.81
Total votes		185,749	100.00
Registered voters/turnout		213,351	87.06
Source: Sternberger et al.
