= 1946 Dahomey and Togo by-election =

A by-election to the French National Assembly was held in French Dahomey and French Togoland on 10 February 1946. The by-election was required after the death of incumbent MP Francis Aupiais on 18 December 1945. Aupiais had been elected via the first college in October 1945.

Jacques Bertho of the Popular Republican Movement was the only candidate, and was elected with 644 of the 818 votes cast.

== Results ==
Candidate	Party	Votes	%
Jacques Bertho	Popular Republican Movement	644	100.00
Total		644	100.00
Valid votes		644	78.73
Invalid/blank votes		174	21.27
Total votes		818	100.00
Registered voters/turnout		1,415	57.81
Source: National Assembly
