= Antoine Meatchi =

Togolese politician (1915–1984)

Antoine Idrissou Meatchi
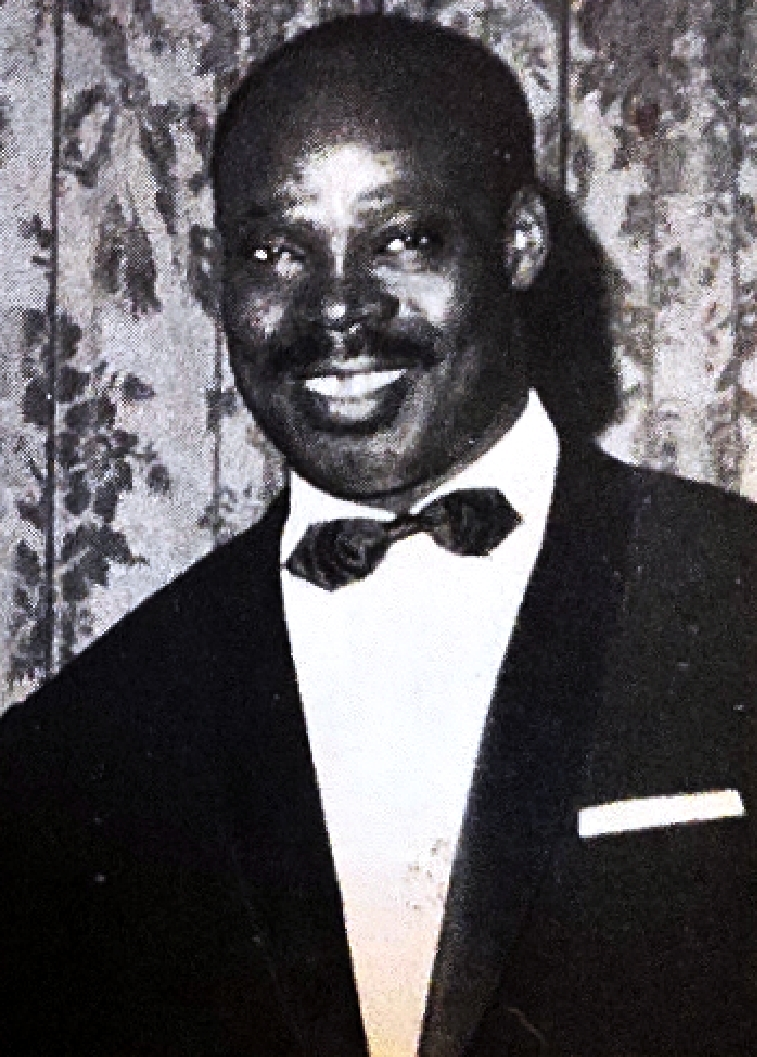
- Born: 15 September 1915; Sokode
- Died: 26 March 1984 (aged 68)

Antoine Idrissou Meatchi (15 September 1915 – 26 March 1984) was a Togolese politician. He was Vice President of Togo under Nicolas Grunitzky following the 1963 coup which overthrew Sylvanus Olympio. Additionally he served as minister of finance from 1963 to 1966. He was deposed in January 1967 in the coup organized by Étienne Eyadéma.

== Early life and education ==
Meatchi was born on 15 September 1915 in Sakode and was related to the local royal family. He had his elementary education in Togo and in 1942 he first traveled to Mali and later to France to study general and tropical agriculture.

== Career and politics ==
After returning to Togo in 1953, Meatchi soon became deputy chief of Agricultural Services Lome, head of the Kluoto Agricultural Promotion in the south west and director of the Tove Farm School. While in this position, Meatchi became interested in politics and he soon got his first political appointment in 1956 under Grunitzky who was Togo's first elected prime minister. Meatchi was appointed minister of agriculture and a year later, he was given the finance portfolio. Although the legality of the 1956 elections was contested by Olympio's Committee of Togolese Unity (CUT) and it had to redone under the supervision of the UN in 1958, Meatchi won a seat representing Pagouda in the north while Grunitzky lost to his political rival Sylvanus Olympio.

=== Leader of the opposition ===
After Grunitzky's retirement from politics and his departure to Ivory Coast in 1961, Meatchi became the leader of the Union of Chiefs and Peoples of the North (UCPN) and the leader of the opposition. Following Togo's independence, some administrative regulations were introduced to crack down on sources of opposition and that led to the loss of Meatchi's parliamentary seat in the 1961 elections. In that same year, Meatchi spoke out against the new constitution amendment that provided a strong presidential system with wide powers lodged in an executive president. As a result he was arrested and accused of plotting against the government. After his release, he left to Accra in Ghana, where he remained in exile until the 1963 coup d'état that led to his return to a position of power, for a while he headed the Bureau of African Affairs in Ghana.

=== Return from exile ===
1962 marked his return from exile as Togo became a one party regime with all parties except the CUT formally banned and that led to a coup in January 1963 mounted by the soldiers and resulting in the assassination of Olympio. After his return from exile he was appointed minister of finance, public works and post and telecommunications in the Grunitzky provisional government. After the 1963 elections he assumed the vice-presidency, with responsibility for finance and economic planning in the new split executive government. He also held the portfolio of minister of interior from November 1966 to January 1967. The new constitution arrangement lasted for four years and turned out to be disastrous. After the abolishment of the office of the Vice President of Togo, Meatchi was appointed to head the Ministry of Works, Mines and Transport in a new government. This new government did not last long. A few weeks later in January 1967, Lieutenant-Colonel Étienne Eyadéma overthrew Grunitzky in a military coup and Meatchi lost his position.

== Later life and death ==
After losing his position as head of Ministry of Works, Mines and Transport, Meatchi lost his credibility and support which made him to retire from active politics. He was later reappointed as director of Agricultural Services, a post he held for several years. He died in 1984.
