= 1958 French Togoland parliamentary election =

- 27 April 1958

46 seats in the Legislative Assembly 24 seats needed for a majority
- Turnout: 64.85% (▼17.54pp)
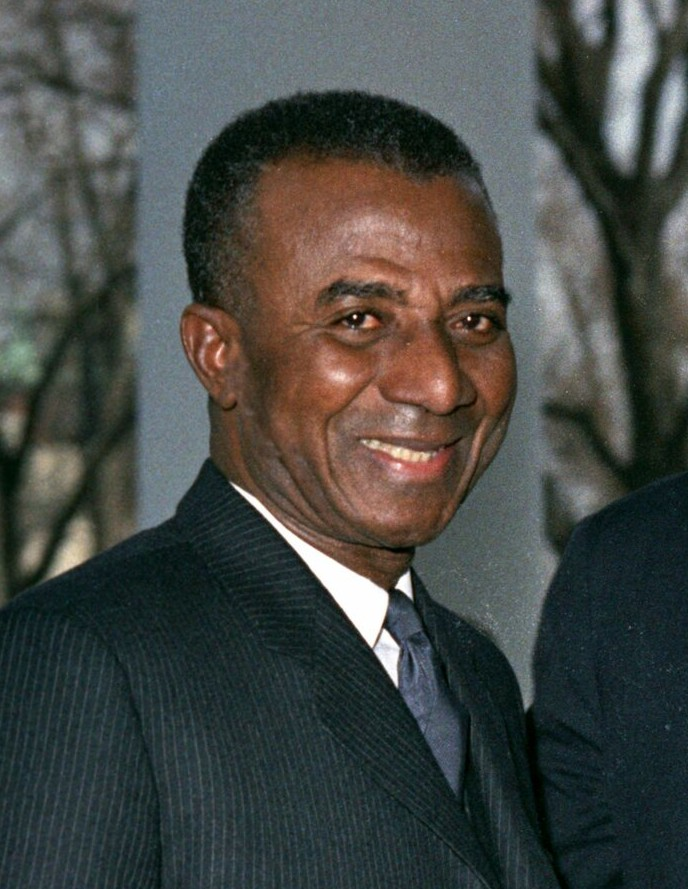

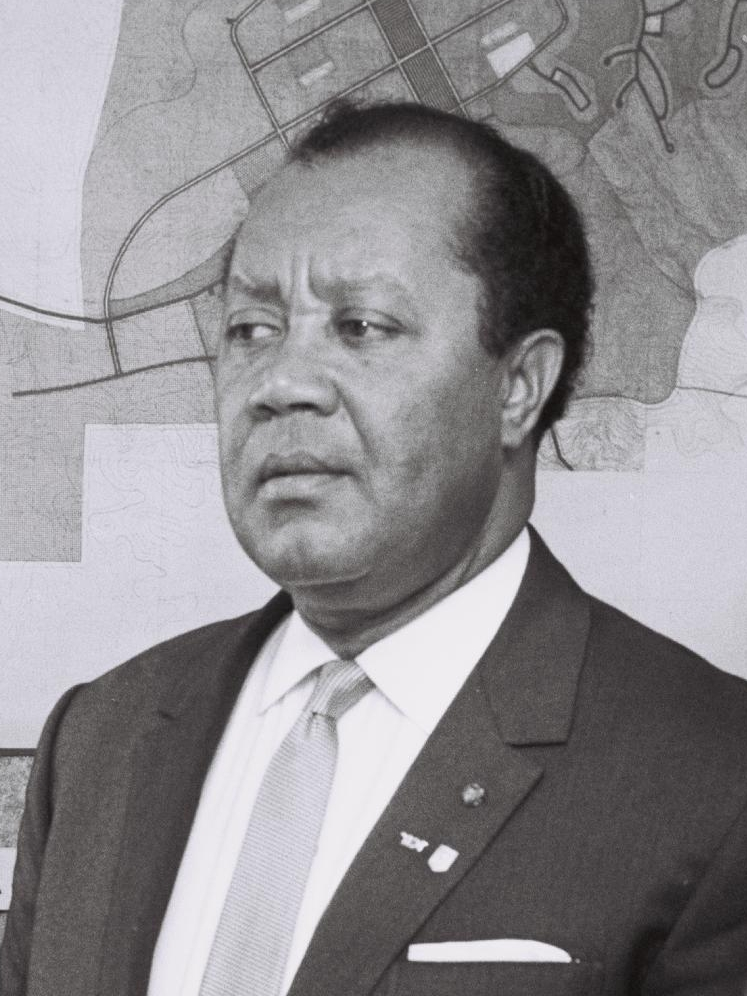
	First party	Second party
Leader	Sylvanus Olympio	Nicolas Grunitzky
Party	CUT	PTP–UCPN
Leader's seat	Did not run	Atakpamé South
Last election	Boycotted	98.59%, 30 seats
Seats won	29	13
Seat change	▲29	▼17
Popular vote	190,098	96,767
Percentage	61.13%	31.12%
Swing	▲61.13pp	▼67.47pp
- Results by constituency
Prime Minister before election
Nicolas Grunitzky
PTP–UCPN
Elected Prime Minister
Sylvanus Olympio
CUT

Parliamentary elections were held in French Togoland on 27 April 1958. The result was a victory for the Committee of Togolese Unity, which won 29 of the 46 seats in the Legislative Assembly. Voter turnout was 64.9%.

== Results ==
Party	Votes	%	Seats	+/–
Committee of Togolese Unity	190,098	61.13	29	New
Union of Chiefs and Peoples of the North	56,281	18.10	10	–5
Togolese Party of Progress	40,486	13.02	3	–12
Togolese People's Movement	842	0.27	0	0
Juvento	510	0.16	0	New
Rally of Young Togolese	6	0.00	0	New
Independents	22,753	7.32	4	New
Total	310,976	100.00	46	+16
Valid votes	310,976	97.96		
Invalid/blank votes	6,481	2.04		
Total votes	317,457	100.00		
Registered voters/turnout	489,519	64.85		
Source: Nohlen et al.

=== Elected MPs ===
Constituency	Member	Party
Akposso East	Firmin Abalo	Committee of Togolese Unity
Akposso West	Y. O. Philippe Afola	Committee of Togolese Unity
Aného East	T. Augustin Agboh	Committee of Togolese Unity
Aného North	Francis Chardey	Committee of Togolese Unity
Aného South	Fio Abgano II	Committee of Togolese Unity
Aného South	Emmanuel Kponton	Committee of Togolese Unity
Aného West	Kouassi Anani	Committee of Togolese Unity
Atakpamé North	Clément Kolor	Committee of Togolese Unity
Atakpamé South	Nicolas Grunitzky	Togolese Party of Progress
Bafilo	Esso Gblao	Committee of Togolese Unity
Bassar North	Nanamalé Gbégbéni	Union of Chiefs and Peoples of the North
Bassar South	Michel Tidjin Tchédré	Committee of Togolese Unity
Dapaong North	S. Raphaël Djimongou	Committee of Togolese Unity
Dapaong North-East	Yempagou Oumorou	Committee of Togolese Unity
Dapaong South	Laurent Djagba	Committee of Togolese Unity
Dapaong South-East	Tchougli Pierre Nahm	Committee of Togolese Unity
Dapaong West	Mogoré Joseph Youma	Committee of Togolese Unity
Kabou	Mama Moumouni	Committee of Togolese Unity
Kandé	Kparou Polo	Independent
Kloto Centre	Gerson Kpotsra	Committee of Togolese Unity
Kloto North	A. Ernest Gassou	Committee of Togolese Unity
Kloto South	K. Joseph Tsogbé	Committee of Togolese Unity
Lama-Kara East	François Batchassi	Independent
Lama-Kara North	Marcel Agba	Union of Chiefs and Peoples of the North
Lama-Kara South	Djobo Benoît Palanga	Union of Chiefs and Peoples of the North
Lama-Kara West	Albert Kpatha	Union of Chiefs and Peoples of the North
Lomé East	Anani Santos	Committee of Togolese Unity
Lomé North	Paulin Akouété	Independent
Lomé South	Paulin Freitas	Committee of Togolese Unity
Lomé West	André Akakpo	Committee of Togolese Unity
Mango North	Koukoura Djangbedji	Union of Chiefs and Peoples of the North
Mango South	Emmanuel Kokoussaya	Union of Chiefs and Peoples of the North
Niamtougou East	B. Léonard Ywassa	Union of Chiefs and Peoples of the North
Niamtougou West	Clément Aissa	Union of Chiefs and Peoples of the North
Notsé	Albert Doh	Committee of Togolese Unity
Pagouda Centre	Valentin Blakimé	Union of Chiefs and Peoples of the North
Pagouda West	Antoine Meatchi	Union of Chiefs and Peoples of the North
Sokodé Centre	Mama Arouna	Committee of Togolese Unity
Sokodé East	Paul Brassier	Independent
Sokodé West	Simssi François Hainga	Committee of Togolese Unity
Tabligbo East	Jean Gnininvi	Committee of Togolese Unity
Tabligbo West	Michel Ayassou	Togolese Party of Progress
Tsévié East	Emmanuel Fiawoo	Togolese Party of Progress
Tsévié North	Paul Guedzé	Committee of Togolese Unity
Tsévié South	Jonathan Savi de Tové	Committee of Togolese Unity
Tsévié West	Koffi Jean Sokpor	Committee of Togolese Unity
