= Kléber Dadjo =

President of Togo in 1967

President of Togo Interim
- In office 14 January 1967 – 14 April 1967
- Preceded by: Nicolas Grunitzky
- Succeeded by: Etienne Eyadéma

Personal details
- Born: 12 August 1914 Siou, Togoland
- Died: 23 September 1988/89 (aged 74–75)

Kléber Dadjo (12 August 1914 – 23 September 1988 or 23 September 1989) was a Togolese politician and military officer who served as Interim President of Togo in his role as Chairman of the National Reconciliation Committee from 14 January 1967 to 14 April 1967 following the overthrow of President Nicolas Grunitzky's government.

== Biography ==
Kléber Dadjo was born in Siou on 12 August 1914. He was of the Nawde (or Losso) ethnic and linguistic group.

Dadjo served in the British Army during World War II and in the French Army in the Indochina and Algerian conflicts. At the time of Togo's independence in 1960, he was the longest-serving and highest-ranking Togolese in the French Army. He held the rank of Captain and commanded Togo's tiny defence force, the Garde Togolaise. He was promoted to Major and eventually to Colonel after the 1963 coup d'état and served as head of the military cabinet of President Nicolas Grunitzky.

After the second military coup d'état on 13 January 1967, Dadjo was named interim President of Togo (as Chairman of the Comité National de Reconciliation), a position that he held until 14 April 1967, when Lt. Col. Gnassingbé Etienne Eyadéma was named president. From 1967 to 1968 he served as Minister of Justice and as Chef du Cabinet Militaire de la Présidence de la République.

In 1968, Dadjo retired and returned to his home in Siou where he became Chef de Canton.

Dadjo died on 23 September 1988 or 23 September 1989.

In 2006, Dadjo was recognised by the government of President Faure Gnassingbé along with former presidents Sylvanus Olympio and Nicolas Grunitzky and former Vice President Antoine Méatchi as part of a decision to rehabilitate the image of Togo's previous leaders. The former avenue de la Nouvelle Marche in Lomé was renamed avenue Kléber Dadjo in his honor.

Dadjo is frequently and erroneously identified in print as a Kabyé rather than a Nawde (or Losso).
