= Emmanuel Bodjollé =

Togolese soldier who led the 1963 coup d'état

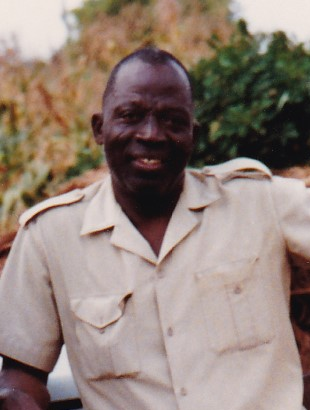
- Bodjollé in 1985

Acting President of Togo
- In office 13 January 1963 – 15 January 1963
- Preceded by: Sylvanus Olympio
- Succeeded by: Nicolas Grunitzky

Personal details
- Born: 1928
- Died: December 1994 (aged 65–66)
- Occupation: Soldier
- Known for: Chairman of the nine-member Insurrection Committee that overthrew the government of Togolese President Sylvanus Olympio

Emmanuel Bodjollé (1928 – December 1994) was a Togolese former military officer who was chairman of the nine-member Insurrection Committee that overthrew the government of President Sylvanus Olympio on 13 January 1963.

== Biography ==
Bodjollé, a former master-sergeant in the French army, had been among a group of around 300 soldiers who on discharge from the French services had not been integrated into the Togolese army. He led a conspiracy of around thirty other former non-commissioned officers, who arrested the ministers of Olympio's government. The coup saw former president Olympio shot dead at the gate of the US embassy compound by Etienne Eyadéma, later known as Gnassingbé Eyadéma, a later president of Togo.

Bodjollé's coup installed Nicolas Grunitzky as Togolese leader.
