= 1955 French Togoland Territorial Assembly election =

- 12 June 1955
- All 30 seats in the Territorial Assembly; 16 seats needed for a majority
- Turnout: 82.39% (▲0.09pp)
Party	Leader	Vote %	Seats	+/–
UCPN	Collective leadership	53.80	15	0
PTP	Nicolas Grunitzky	44.79	15	+9
This lists parties that won seats. See the complete results below.
Prime Minister before	Prime Minister after
Office established	Nicolas Grunitzky; PTP

Territorial Assembly elections were held in French Togoland on 12 June 1955. The Togolese Party of Progress and the Union of Chiefs and Peoples of the North both won 15 of the 30 seats. The Committee of Togolese Unity boycotted the elections.

== Results ==
Party	Votes	%	Seats	+/–
Union of Chiefs and Peoples of the North	79,876	53.80	15	0
Togolese Party of Progress	66,500	44.79	15	+9
Togolese People's Movement	2,089	1.41	0	New
Total	148,465	100.00	30	0
Valid votes	148,465	94.81		
Invalid/blank votes	8,125	5.19		
Total votes	156,590	100.00		
Registered voters/turnout	190,053	82.39		
Source: Sternberger et al.
