= 1951 French Togoland Representative Assembly election =

Representative Assembly elections were held in French Togoland on 9 and 30 December 1951.

== Results ==
Party	Votes	%	Seats	+/–
First College
			6	0
Second College
Union of Chiefs and Peoples of the North			12	New
Togolese Party of Progress			11	+10
Committee of Togolese Unity			1	–13
Total			30	0
Source: Afrology

=== Elected members ===
Sylvanus Olympio was the sole elected member for the Committee of Togolese Unity.
