= Bassar =

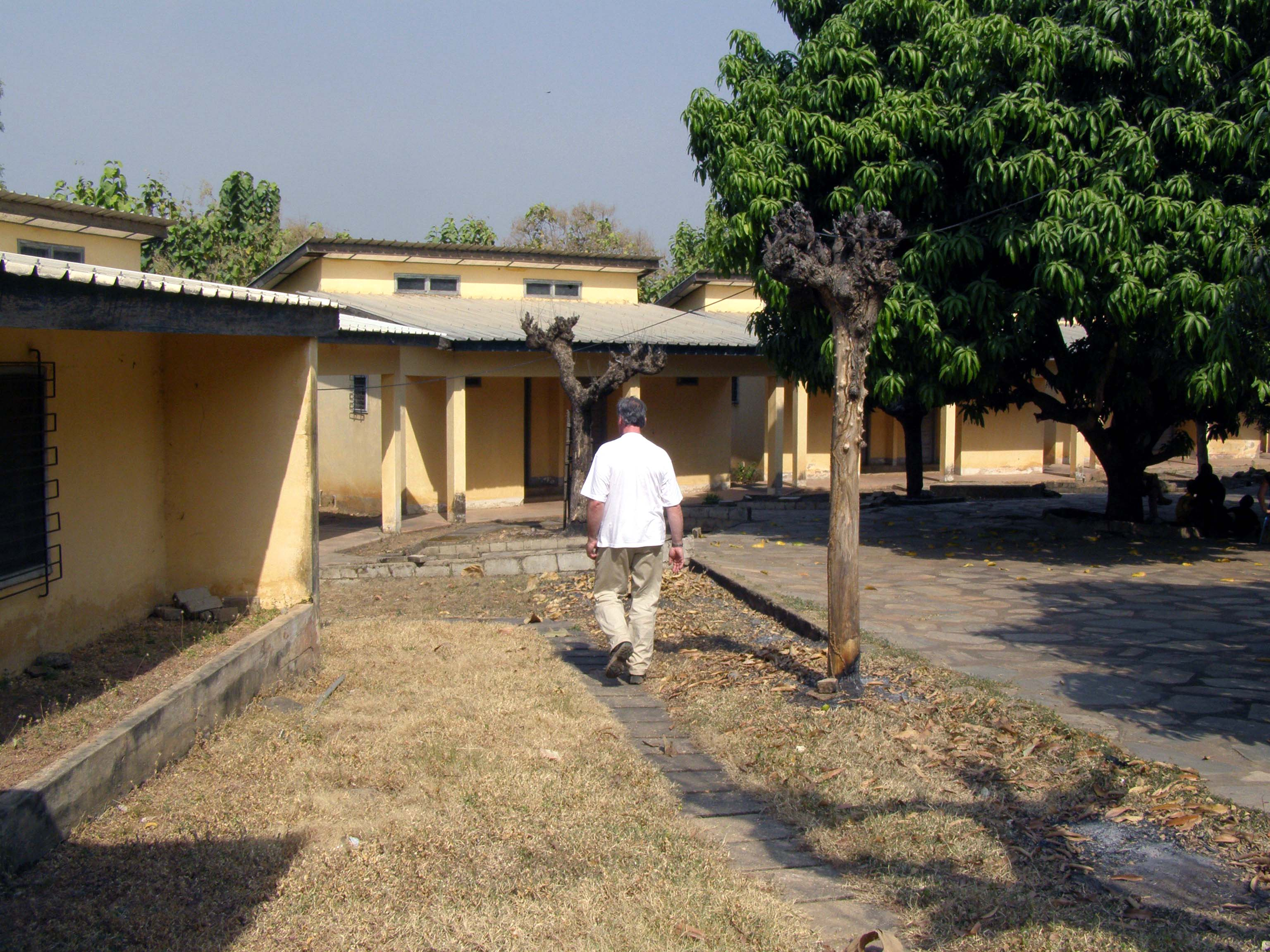

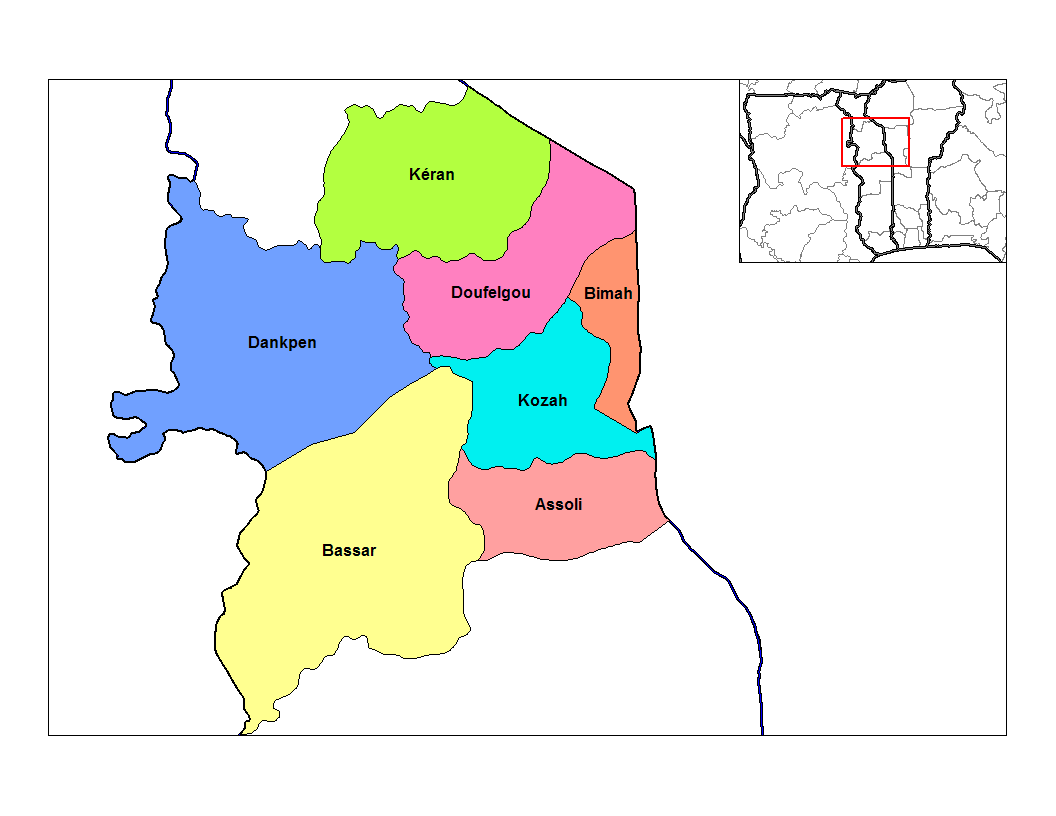
- Location of the prefecture in the Kara Region

- Location in Togo
- Coordinates: 9°15′N 0°47′E
- Country: Togo
- Region: Kara Region
- Prefecture: Bassar Prefecture

Bassar is a town in Bassar Prefecture, Kara Region in Togo, situated west of Kara. The town borders Tatale which is in Ghana. The town has a population of 64,888.

== Culture ==
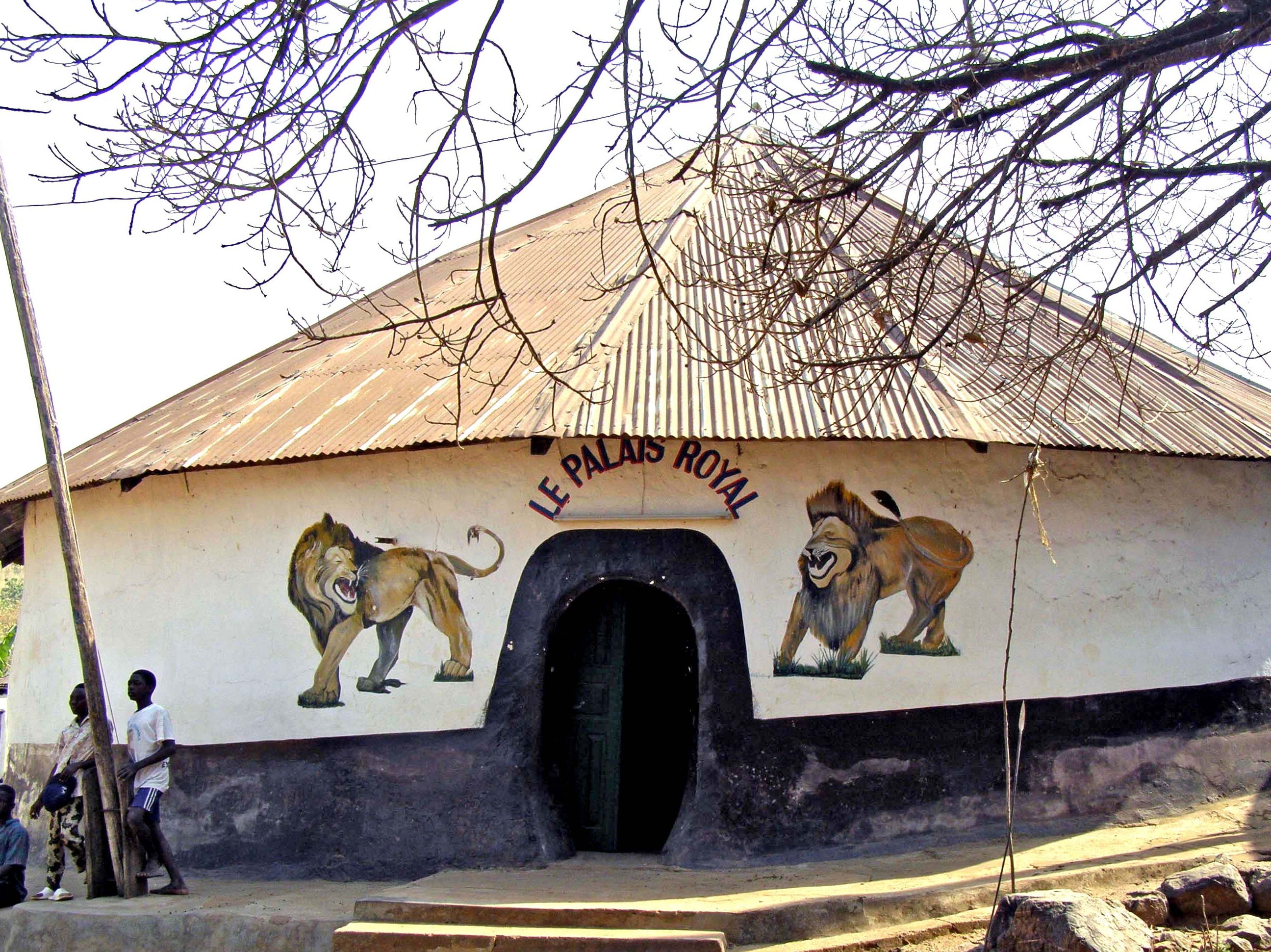
Bassar Royal Palace

Bassar was originally a centre for iron making, which was disrupted by the slave trade.

It now is known as the yam capital of Togo. Bassar is best known for producing the Labaco variety of yam which is the preferred type for making fufu, a staple of Togolese cuisine.

Bassar has a King, a heritage which is passed down the generations. The King's seat is at Le Palais Royal (the Royal Palace).

The theme of death is common in the town, with a "House of the Dead" and mausoleum of deceased Bassar kings; sacrifices of animals such as goats are commonly made.

== Gallery ==
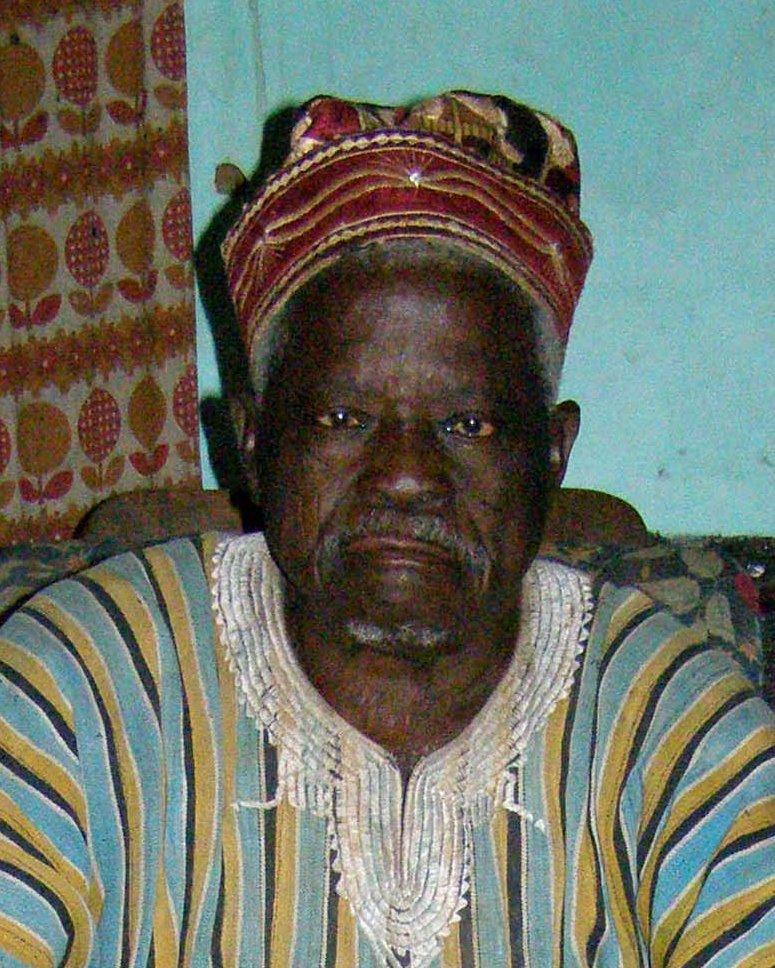
The King of Bassar

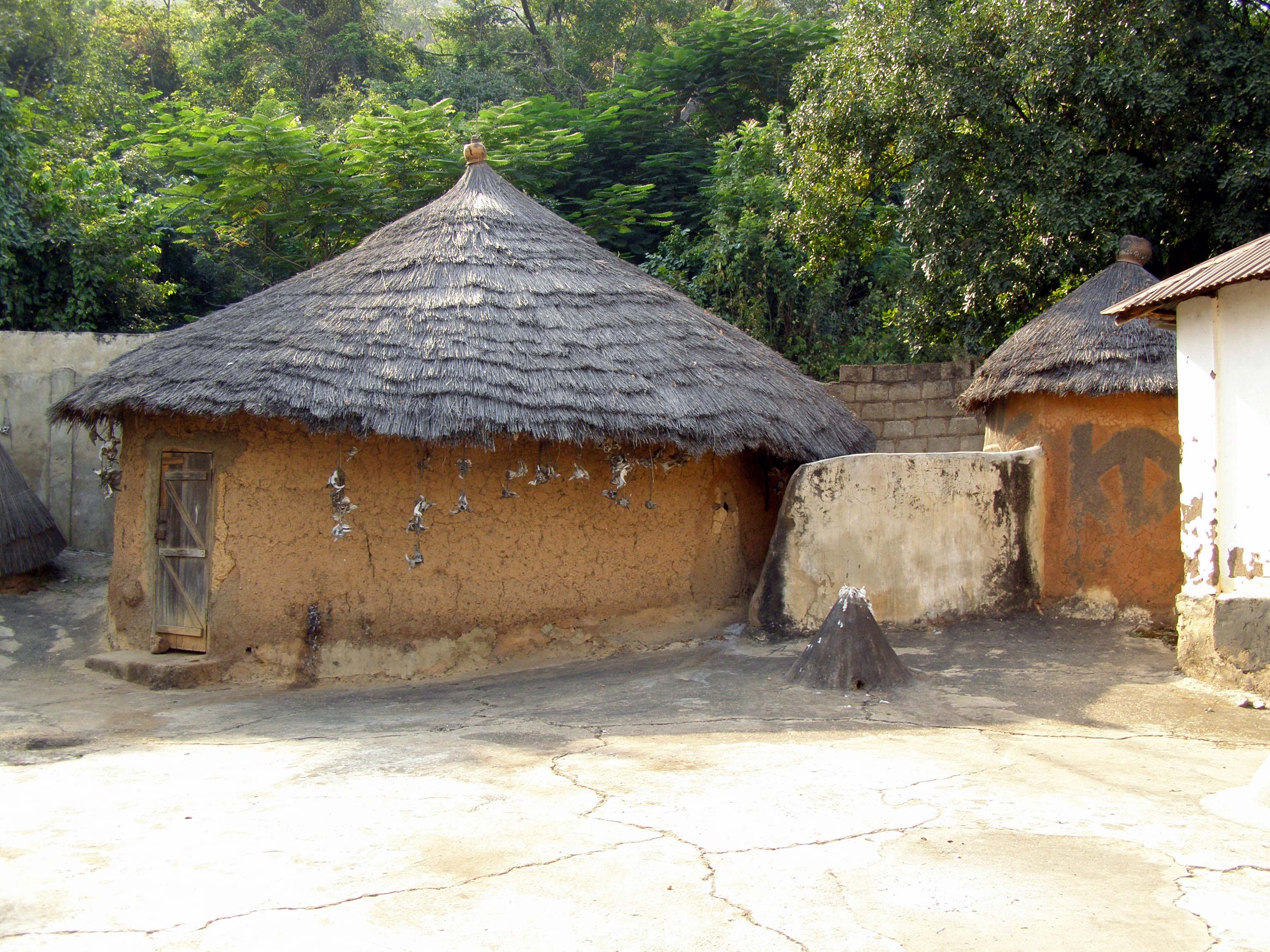
Houses of the Dead

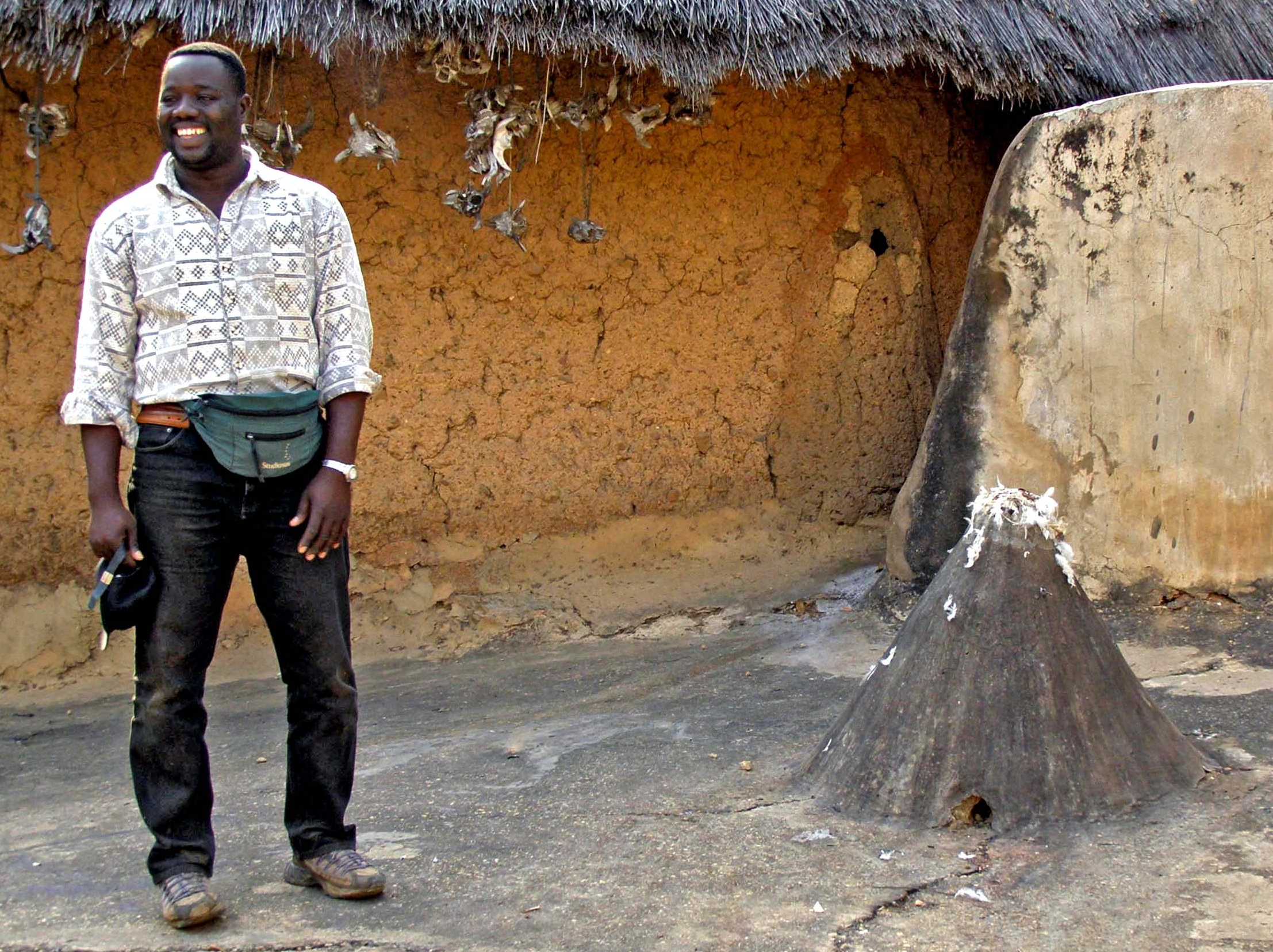
King's mausoleum

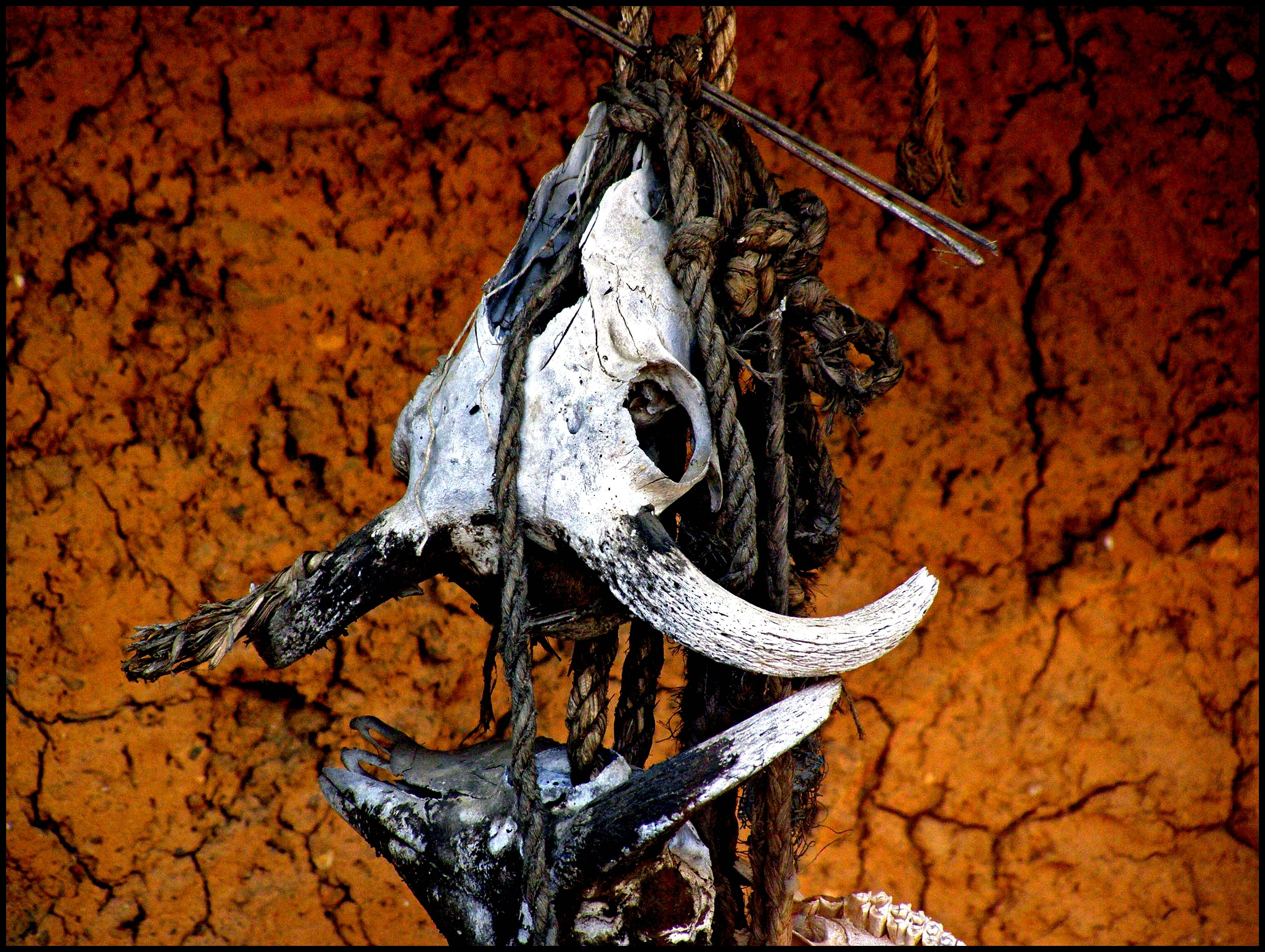
Sacrificed goat
