= Namoudjoga rock paintings =

Rock art site in northern Togo

- Rock paintings at Namoudjoga

- Location within Togo
- Type: Rock art site
- Location: Namoudjoga, near Dapaong, Togo
- Region: Savanes Region

Site notes
- Discovered: 1990

The Namoudjoga rock paintings are a group of rock paintings in the Namoudjoga hills of the Savanes Region in northern Togo, near Dapaong. The paintings occur on a large rock shelter and include human and animal figures, horsemen and geometric signs. They form part of a wider group of rock-art sites in the Dapaong area, which also includes paintings at Sogou and Maogdjoal.

== Description ==
=== Location ===
The Namoudjoga site lies approximately 25 to 30 kilometres (16 to 19 mi) east of Dapaong, near the locality of Namoudjoga, beside the road from Dapaong to Namoudjoga via Korbongou. It is about 25 kilometres (16 mi) from Dapaong.

The paintings are found on a large natural rock formation resembling a mushroom or rock shelter. Other painted rock sites are recorded at the Sodjoual hills at Sogou and at Maogdjoal in the wider Dapaong area.

The representations include human and animal figures, horsemen and geometric signs. Four groups of representations are described at Namoudjoga. The first includes a horseman, two animals, a human figure and two unidentified geometric forms. A second group depicts a horseman with two horses, while the fourth contains about five horsemen and a standing human figure.

The nearby Sogou site consists of several painted stations on rock faces. Its recorded motifs include vertical and horizontal strokes, lines of dots, circles, isolated dots, horsemen and animal figures, along with geometric, human and animal motifs among the Namoudjoga paintings.

=== Archaeological context ===
Archaeological material is found around the Namoudjoga rock shelter, including discarded lithic material made from flint, pottery sherds and remains associated with ancient iron metallurgy and prehistoric stone-tool production in the wider Dapaong area. Evidence of human occupation and settlement in the region has also been found.

=== Discovery and documentation ===
The paintings at Namoudjoga and Sogou were discovered in 1990 by missionaries. They were subsequently included in descriptions of archaeological and cultural heritage sites in northern Togo.

== Conservation, tourism and cultural heritage ==
The paintings are exposed to natural weathering and human activity. In 2025, erosion, climatic conditions and vandalism threatened the site, which had limited protective measures. Fading of the paintings is also a consequence of unrestricted physical contact with the rock surfaces.

The Namoudjoga rock paintings are promoted as a cultural and tourist attraction in northern Togo. The site is described as one of the principal attractions of the Dapaong area.

Tourism material for Dapaong commonly groups Namoudjoga with other cultural sites in the surrounding area, including the caves and cliff granaries of Nok and Maproug and the regional museum in Dapaong.

== See also ==
=== Related articles ===
- Dapaong
