= 1952 French Togoland Territorial Assembly election =

Territorial Assembly elections were held in French Togoland on 30 March 1952. The result was a victory for the Union of Chiefs and Peoples of the North, which won 15 of the 30 seats.

== Results ==
Three of the MPs elected on Committee of Togolese Unity (CUT) lists were not party members; one was a trade unionist and two were members of local parties.

Party	Votes	%	Seats
Union of Chiefs and Peoples of the North	20,316	48.99	15
Committee of Togolese Unity−Juvento	10,650	25.68	9
Togolese Party of Progress	10,505	25.33	6
Total	41,471	100.00	30
Valid votes	41,471	98.97	
Invalid/blank votes	433	1.03	
Total votes	41,904	100.00	
Registered voters/turnout	50,915	82.30	
Source: Sternberger et al.
