= 1963 Togolese constitutional referendum =

- 5 May 1963

Results
Choice	Votes	%
Yes	568,402	98.53%
No	8,484	1.47%
Valid votes	576,886	99.07%
Invalid or blank votes	5,423	0.93%
Total votes	582,309	100.00%
Registered voters/turnout	639,524	91.05%

A constitutional referendum was held in Togo on 5 May 1963 alongside general elections. The changes to the constitution would make the country a presidential republic with a unicameral National Assembly. It was approved by 99% of voters with a 91% turnout.

== Results ==
Choice	Votes	%
For	568,402	98.53
Against	8,484	1.47
Total	576,886	100.00
Valid votes	576,886	99.07
Invalid/blank votes	5,423	0.93
Total votes	582,309	100.00
Registered voters/turnout	639,524	91.05
Source: Sternberger et al.
