= 1956 French Togoland autonomy referendum =

- 28 October 1956
- Remain a Trust Territory or an autonomous region within the French Union?
- Outcome: Results rejected by the United Nations General Assembly.; French Togoland remains a United Nations Trust Territory.

Results
Choice	Votes	%
Autonomous region within the French Union	313,458	93.35%
Trust Territory	22,320	6.65%
Valid votes	335,778	99.11%
Invalid or blank votes	3,003	0.89%
Total votes	338,781	100.00%
Registered voters/turnout	438,175	77.32%

A referendum on autonomy was held in French Togoland on 28 October 1956. Since World War I, the territory had been a League of Nations mandate and then a United Nations Trust Territory under French control. The referendum offered residents the choice of remaining a Trust Territory or becoming an autonomous region within the French Union. The result was 93% in favour of the latter, with a 77% turnout. However, the referendum was rejected by the United Nations General Assembly as it had not included the option of independence and opted to continue with the trusteeship. In neighbouring British Togoland, a referendum earlier in the year had resulted in the territory becoming part of Ghana.

The trusteeship was ended in 1960 when French Togoland became independent as Togo.

== Results ==
Choice	Votes	%
Autonomous region in the French Union	313,458	93.35
UN Trusteeship	22,320	6.65
Total	335,778	100.00
Valid votes	335,778	99.11
Invalid/blank votes	3,003	0.89
Total votes	338,781	100.00
Registered voters/turnout	438,175	77.32
Source: African Elections Database
