= 1961 Togolese constitutional referendum =

Referendum on becoming a presidential republic with a directly elected president

- 9 April 1961

Results
Choice	Votes	%
Yes	560,258	99.62%
No	2,114	0.38%
Valid votes	562,372	99.60%
Invalid or blank votes	2,245	0.40%
Total votes	564,617	100.00%
Registered voters/turnout	627,688	89.95%

A constitutional referendum was held in Togo on 9 April 1961 alongside the general elections. The changes to the constitution would make the country a presidential republic with a directly elected President. It was approved by 99.62% of voters with a 90% turnout.

== Results ==
Choice	Votes	%
For	560,258	99.62
Against	2,114	0.38
Total	562,372	100.00
Valid votes	562,372	99.60
Invalid/blank votes	2,245	0.40
Total votes	564,617	100.00
Registered voters/turnout	627,688	89.95
Source: African Elections Database
