= Togolese Party of Progress =

Togolese Party of Progress Parti togolais du progrès
- Abbreviation: PTP
- Founder: Nicolas Grunitzky; Pedro Olympio; Dermane Ayéva
- Founded: 1946
- Dissolved: 1959
- Merged into: Democratic Union of the Togolese People

The Togolese Party of Progress (French: Parti togolais du progrès, PTP) was a political party in Togo.

== History ==
The party was established by Nicolas Grunitzky, Pedro Olympio and Dermane Ayéva in 1946, becoming the second party in Togo. Its formation was encouraged by the French authorities, who were concerned about the anti-French attitude of the Committee of Togolese Unity (CUT).

Grunitzky stood as the PTP candidate for the November 1946 French National Assembly elections, but was defeated by Martin Aku of the CUT. In the Representative Assembly elections in December the party won just one of the 24 African seats.

By the early 1950s the party had increased in popularity; in the 1951 Representative Assembly elections it won 11 of the 24 seats, whilst in the 1951 French elections Grunitzky defeated Aku. He was subsequently re-elected unopposed in the 1956 elections.

The PTP won six of the 30 seats in the 1952 Territorial Assembly elections with 25% of the vote. In 1954 a split in the party led to the formation of the Togolese People's Movement. In the 1955 elections the party's vote share increased to 45%, as it won 15 seats, with its ally, the Union of Chiefs and Peoples of the North (UCPN), winning the other 15. However, it was reduced to three seats in the 1958 elections.

In October 1959 the party merged with the UCPN to form the Democratic Union of the Togolese People.
