= Union of Chiefs and Peoples of the North =

Union of Chiefs and Peoples of the North Union des Chefs et des Populations du Nord
- Abbreviation: UCPN
- Founded: 1951
- Dissolved: October 1959
- Split from: Committee of Togolese Unity
- Merged into: Democratic Union of the Togolese People

The Union of Chiefs and Peoples of the North (French: Union des Chefs et des Populations du Nord, UCPN) was a political party in Togo.

== History ==
The party was established in 1951 as an organisation representing traditional chiefs and notables from northern Togoland, and was allied with the pro-French Togolese Party of Progress (PTP). In the December 1951 Representative Assembly elections it won 12 of the 24 Second College seats. In the 1952 elections it won 15 of the 30 seats. It won 15 seats again in the 1955 elections, but was reduced to ten seats in the 1958 elections as the Assembly was increased in size to 46 seats.

In October 1959 the party merged with the PTP to form the Democratic Union of the Togolese People.
