= 1972 Togolese presidential referendum =

- 9 January 1972
- Do you want General Eyadéma to continue the functions of President of the Republic entrusted to him by the army and the people?

Results
Choice	Votes	%
Yes	867,941	99.90%
No	878	0.10%
Valid votes	868,819	99.98%
Invalid or blank votes	170	0.02%
Total votes	868,989	100.00%
Registered voters/turnout	880,890	98.65%

A referendum on coup leader Gnassingbé Eyadéma remaining as the president was held in Togo on 9 January 1972. Eyadéma had overthrown the government in 1967 and installed himself as president on 14 April.

Voters were asked the question "Do you want General Eyadéma to continue the functions of president of the republic entrusted to him by the army and the people?" The result was reported to be 99.9% of voters in favour with a 97.8% turnout.

== Results ==
Choice	Votes	%
For	867,941	99.9
Against	878	0.1
Invalid/blank votes	170	−
Total	868,989	100
Registered voters/turnout	880,890	98.6
Source: Sternberger et al.
