= Juvento =

Political party in Togo

- Founded: 25 September 1951
- Ideology: Social democracy

Juvento, also known as the Mouvement de Jeunesse Togolaise (lit. Togolese Youth Movement), is a social democratic political party in Togo.

== History ==
The party was formed 25 September 1951 as a radical youth wing of the Committee of Togolese Unity (CUT). It ran in alliance with the CUT in the 1952 Territorial Assembly elections, with the two parties winning nine of the 30 seats. It did not contest the 1955 elections and failed to win a seat in the 1958 elections, when it received just 0.2% of the vote. The following year it split from the CUT to become a standalone party.

Following the 1963 coup it was one of four parties to join the Reconciliation and National Union, which presented a single list in the 1963 parliamentary elections, with each party taking 14 seats. However, the party was dissolved after the 1967 coup.

In the early 1990s a new party was formed using the same name. It won two seats in the 2002 parliamentary elections, but received just 0.2% of the vote in the 2007 parliamentary elections, losing both seats.
