= Kozah Prefecture =

Coordinates: 9°32′N 1°11′E

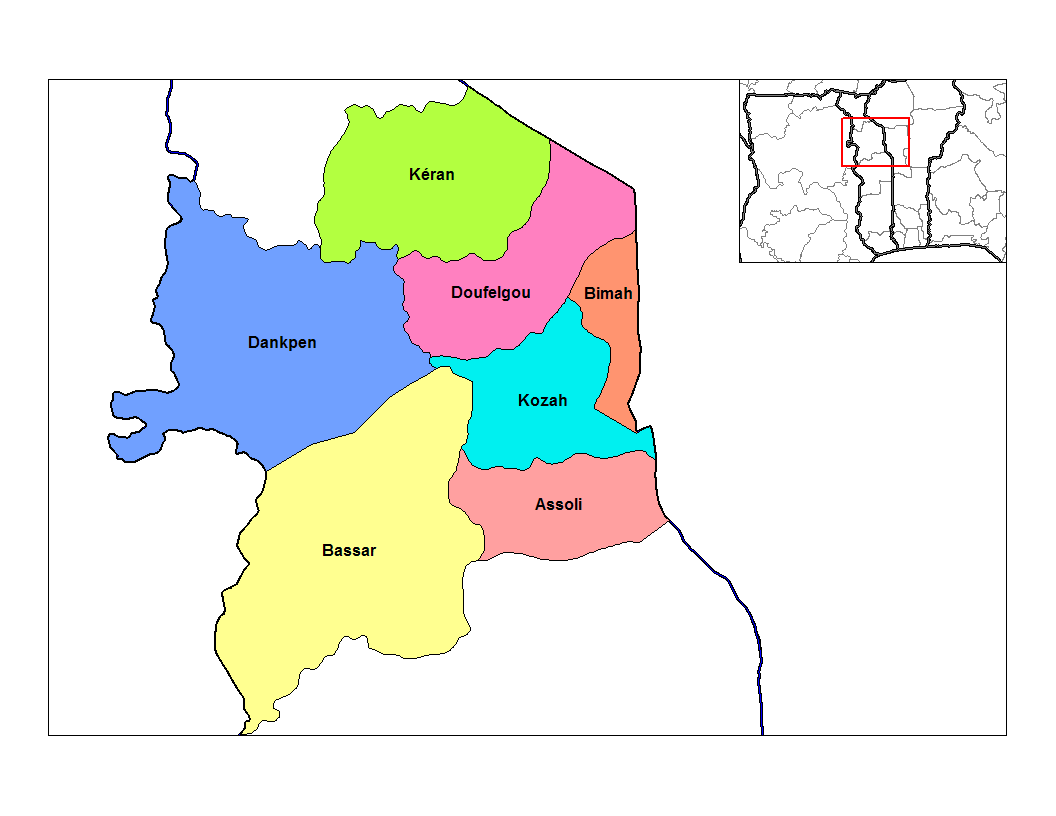
Prefectures of Kara

Kozah is a prefecture located in the Kara Region of Togo. The prefecture covers 1,084 km^{2}, with a population in 2022 of 283,738.

The cantons (or subdivisions) of Kozah include Lama, Lassa, Soumdina, Landa, Kouméa, Tcharé, Pya, Tchitchao, Sarakawa, Yadé, Bohou, Landa-Kpinzindè, Djamdè, Atchangbadè, and Awandjélo.
