= 1967 Togolese coup d'état =

1967 coup in Togo

Date	13 January 1967
Location	Lomé, Togo 6°7′55″N 1°13′22″E
Result	Coup attempt succeeds.: Nicolas Grunitzky is removed from power.; Kléber Dadjo is installed as the Chairman of the National Reconciliation Committee.

Belligerents
Government	Army faction

Commanders and leaders
Nicolas Grunitzky	Étienne Eyadéma; Kléber Dadjo

Casualties and losses
- No casualties reported.
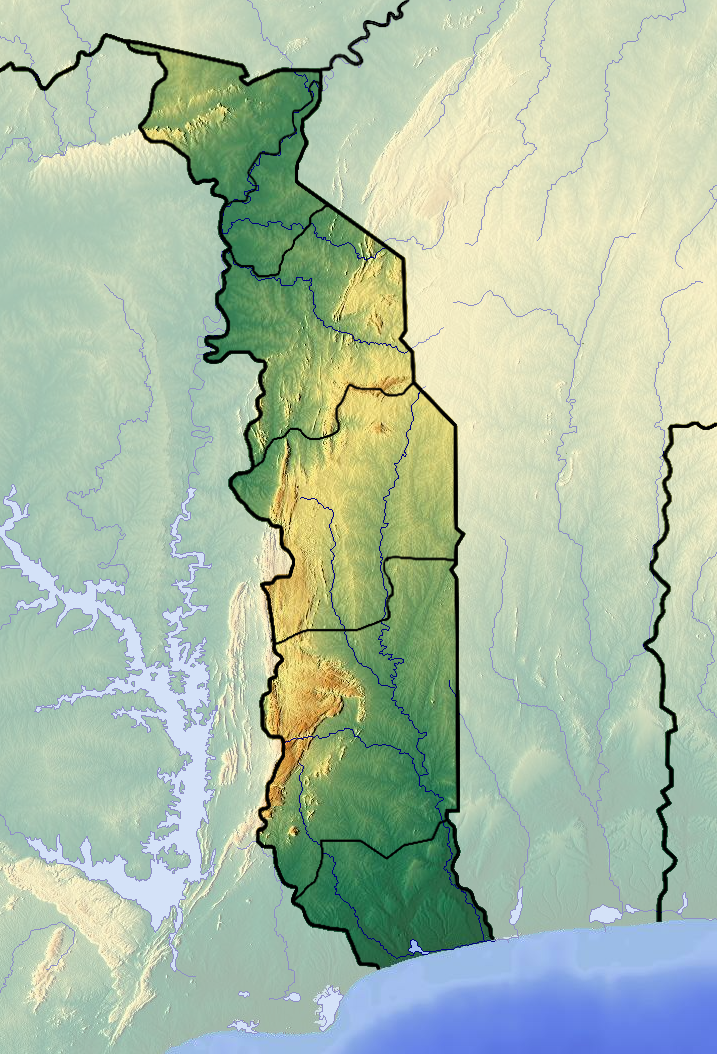
- Nexus of coup in Lomé (marked green), Togo

The 1967 Togolese coup d'état was a bloodless military coup that occurred in the West African country of Togo on 13 January 1967. The leader of the coup, Lieutenant Colonel Étienne Eyadéma (later General Gnassingbé Eyadéma) ousted Togo's second President, Nicolas Grunitzky, whom he essentially brought to power following the 1963 coup d'état.

Following the coup, political parties were banned, and all constitutional processes were suspended. Colonel Kléber Dadjo was named interim President of Togo (as Chairman of the National Reconciliation Committee), a position that he held until 14 April 1967, when Eyadéma assumed the presidency.

Eyadéma went on to rule the country until his death on 5 February 2005.
