= 1961 Togolese general election =

- 9 April 1961
- Registered: 627,688
- Turnout: 89.97% (▲25.12pp)
- Presidential election
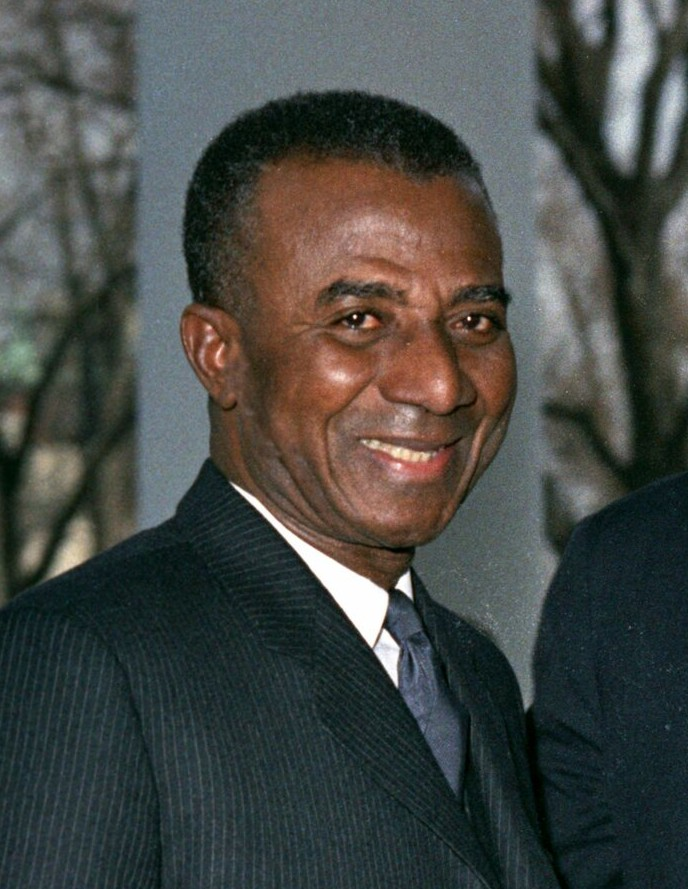
Nominee	Sylvanus Olympio
Party	CUT
Popular vote	560,938
Percentage	100%
President before election
Office established
Elected President
Sylvanus Olympio
CUT
- Legislative election
- All 52 seats in the National Assembly; 27 seats needed for a majority
Party	Leader	Vote %	Seats	+/–
CUT	Sylvanus Olympio	100	52	+23
This lists parties that won seats. See the complete results below.
Prime Minister before	Prime Minister after
Sylvanus Olympio; CUT	Office abolished

General elections were held in Togo on 9 April 1961, alongside a constitutional referendum. It was the first time the President had been directly elected, and Prime Minister Sylvanus Olympio of the Committee of Togolese Unity was the only candidate. He was elected unopposed, with the PUT won all 52 seats in the National Assembly. Voter turnout was 90.0%.

== Results ==
=== President ===
Candidate	Party	Votes	%
Sylvanus Olympio	Committee of Togolese Unity	560,938	100.00
Total		560,938	100.00
Valid votes		560,938	99.33
Invalid/blank votes		3,779	0.67
Total votes		564,717	100.00
Registered voters/turnout		627,688	89.97
Source: Nohlen et al.

=== National Assembly ===
Party	Votes	%	Seats	+/–
Committee of Togolese Unity	560,938	100.00	52	+23
Total	560,938	100.00	52	+6
Valid votes	560,938	99.33		
Invalid/blank votes	3,779	0.67		
Total votes	564,717	100.00		
Registered voters/turnout	627,688	89.97		
Source: Nohlen et al.
