= Nicolas Grunitzky =

2nd President of Togo (1963–67)

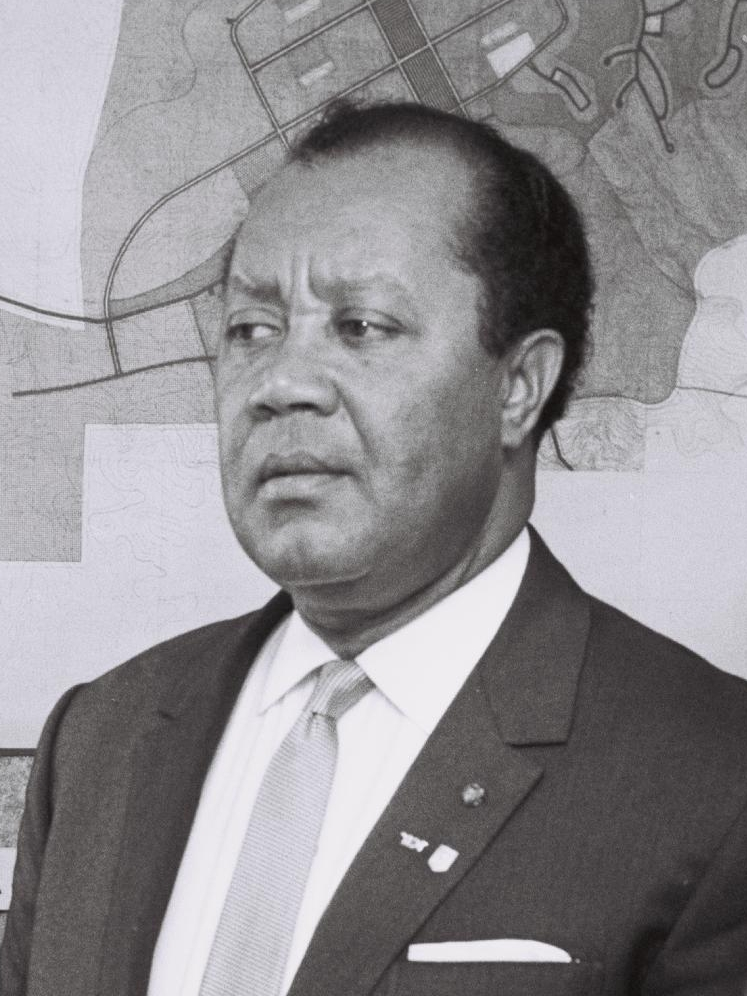
- Grunitzky in 1964

2nd President of Togo
- In office 16 January 1963 – 13 January 1967
- Vice President: Antoine Meatchi
- Preceded by: Emmanuel Bodjollé
- Succeeded by: Kléber Dadjo

Prime Minister of Togo
- In office 12 September 1956 – 16 May 1958
- Preceded by: none
- Succeeded by: Sylvanus Olympio

Personal details
- Born: 5 April 1913 Atakpamé, Togoland
- Died: 27 September 1969 (aged 56) Paris, France
- Party: PTP; UDPT
- Spouse: Vinolia Baeta
- Relations: Sylvanus Olympio (brother-in-law)

Nicolas Grunitzky (French pronunciation: [nikɔla gʁynitski]; 5 April 1913 – 27 September 1969) was the second president of Togo and its third head of state. He was President from 1963 to 1967. Grunitzky was Prime Minister of Togo from 1956 to 1958 under the French Colonial loi cadre system, which created a limited "national" government in their colonial possessions. He was elected Prime Minister of Togo —still under French administration— in 1956. Following the 1963 coup which killed his nationalist political rival and brother-in-law Sylvanus Olympio, Grunitzky was chosen by the military committee of coup leaders to be Togo's second President.

== Biography ==
He was born in Atakpamé in 1913 to a German father and a Togolese mother (of Ghanaian royalty). He studied civil engineering at the ESTP in Paris and was a public administrator before leaving to form his own company. He was the secretary-general of the Togolese Party of Progress and was elected into the Togolese Representative Assembly in 1951. Grunitzky also served in the French National Assembly from 1951 to 1958, winning elections in 1951 and 1956. Supported by France, he became the Prime Minister of the Republic of Togo on 12 September 1956. The PTP and its northern ally, the Union of Chiefs and Peoples of the North, were defeated in elections held on 16 May 1958 by Sylvanus Olympio's Committee of Togolese Unity (CUT) and their nationalist allies Juvento, and Grunitzky subsequently went into exile.

The CUT/JUVENTO government declared Togo's independence on 27 April 1960, and Olympio (Grunitzky's chief political rival and brother-in-law) was elected the first president of independent Togo. Following a coup d'état in 1963 that ended with the assassination of President Olympio, Grunitzky was appointed president by the "Insurrection Committee" headed by Emmanuel Bodjollé. This was the first military coup in Western Africa following independence, and was organized by a group of soldiers under the direction of Sergeant Étienne Gnassingbé Eyadema. Grunitzky attempted to unify the country by including several political parties in his government. He was, however, toppled in a bloodless military coup led by now-Lt. Col Étienne Gnassingbé Eyadema and was exiled to Paris.

He was injured in a car accident in Côte d'Ivoire, and died from complications in a hospital in Paris in 1969.

Preceded by none	Prime Minister of Togo; 1956–1958	Succeeded by Sylvanus Olympio
Preceded by Emmanuel Bodjollé	President of Togo; 1963–1967	Succeeded by Kléber Dadjo
