= Sylvanus Olympio =

President of Togo from 1960 to 1963

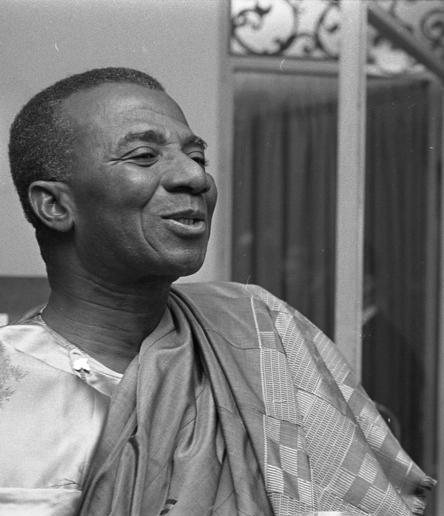
- Olympio in 1961

1st President of Togo
- In office 15 April 1961 – 13 January 1963
- Prime Minister: None
- Preceded by: Office established
- Succeeded by: Emmanuel Bodjollé

1st Prime Minister of Togo
- In office 16 May 1958 – 14 April 1961
- President: None
- Preceded by: Office established
- Succeeded by: Joseph Kokou Koffigoh (1991)

Personal details
- Born: Sylvanus Épiphanio Olympio; 6 September 1902 Kpandu, Togoland
- Died: 13 January 1963 (aged 60) Lomé, Togo
- Cause of death: Assassination
- Party: Party of Togolese Unity
- Spouse: Dina Grunitzky (1903–1964)
- Relations: Octaviano Olympio (uncle); Chico Olympio (uncle); Harry Olympio (nephew); Nicolas Grunitzky (brother-in-law)
- Children: Bonito, Rosita, Gilchrist Olympio, Sylvana and Elpidio
- Parent(s): Epiphanio Elpidio Olympio; Fidélia Afé Nanaga
- Education: London School of Economics

Sylvanus Épiphanio Olympio (French pronunciation: [silvany epifanjo ɔlɛ̃pjo]; 6 September 1902 – 13 January 1963) was a Togolese politician who was prime minister, and then president, of Togo from 1958 until his assassination in 1963. He came from the important Olympio family, which included his uncle Octaviano Olympio, one of the richest people in Togo in the 1900s.

After graduating from the London School of Economics, he worked for Unilever and became the general manager of the African operations of that company. After World War II, Olympio became prominent in efforts for independence of Togo and his party won the 1958 election, making him the prime minister of the country. His power was further cemented when Togo achieved independence and he won the 1961 election, making him the first president of Togo. He was assassinated during the 1963 Togolese coup d'état.

== Early life and business career ==
Sylvanus Olympio was born on 6 September 1902 in Kpandu in the German protectorate of Togoland, present-day Volta Region of Ghana. He was the grandson to the important Brazilian trader Francisco Olympio Sylvio and son to Ephiphanio Olympio, who ran the prominent trading house for the Miller Brothers from Liverpool in Agoué (in present-day Benin). His uncle, Octaviano Olympio, had located his business in Lomé, which would become the capital of the protectorate, and quickly became one of the richest people in the German and then French colony of Togoland. The Olympios therefore belonged to an aristocratic community of mixed Brazilian and other African descent that was related to both the Tabom people of Ghana and the Amaro people of Nigeria.

His early education was at the German Catholic school in Lomé, which his uncle Octaviano had built for the Society for the Divine Word. Following that, he began study at the London School of Economics, where he studied economics under Harold Laski. Upon graduation, Olympio worked for Unilever, first in Nigeria and then in the Gold Coast. By 1929, he was located to head Unilever operations in Togoland.

In 1938, he remained in Lomé, but was promoted to become the general manager of the United Africa Company's, then part of Unilever, operations throughout Africa. During this time, he married Dina Grunitzky, a woman of mixed Ghanaian and German Polish heritage. She was born in Keta (Ghana) as a member of the Amegashie royal family. They had five children together: Bonito, Rosita, Gilchrist, Sylvana and Elpidio.

During World War II, the colony came under the control of the Vichy France government, which treated the Olympio family with general suspicion because of their ties to the British. Olympio was arrested in 1942 and was held under constant surveillance in the remote city of Djougou in French Dahomey. The imprisonment would permanently change his view toward the French and he become active in pushing for independence of Togo at the end of the war.

== Political career ==
Olympio became active in the domestic and international struggle to gain independence for Togo following World War II. Since Togo was not formally a French colony, but was a trustee under the rules of the League of Nations and then the United Nations, Olympio petitioned the United Nations Trusteeship Council for a host of issues pushing toward independence. His 1947 petition to the Trusteeship Council was the first petition for resolution of grievances taken to the United Nations. Domestically, he founded the Comité de l'unité togolaise (CUT), which became the major party opposing French control over Togo.

Olympio's party boycotted most of the elections during the 1950s within Togo because of the heavy French involvement in the elections (including the 1956 election that made Nicolas Grunitzky – who was the brother of Olympio's wife – the Prime Minister of the colony as head of the Togolese Progress Party). In 1954, Olympio was arrested by the French authorities and his right to vote and run for office were suspended. However, his petitions to the Trusteeship Council led to the 1958 elections, where French control over the elections was limited, although involvement remained significant and Olympio's CUT party was able to win every elected position in the national council. The French were then forced to restore Olympio's right to hold office and he became the Prime Minister of the Togo colony and began pressing for independence.

From 1958 until 1961, Olympio served as prime minister of Togo and also served as the minister of finance, minister of foreign affairs, and minister of justice for the colony. He connected with many of the other independence struggles throughout the continent; for example, making Ahmed Sékou Touré, first president of Guinea, conseiller special to his government in 1960. In 1961, as part of the transition of power away from French control, the country voted for a president and affirmed the Constitution developed by Olympio and his party. Olympio defeated Grunitzky with more than 90% of the vote to become the first president of Togo and the Constitution was approved.

=== Foreign policy ===
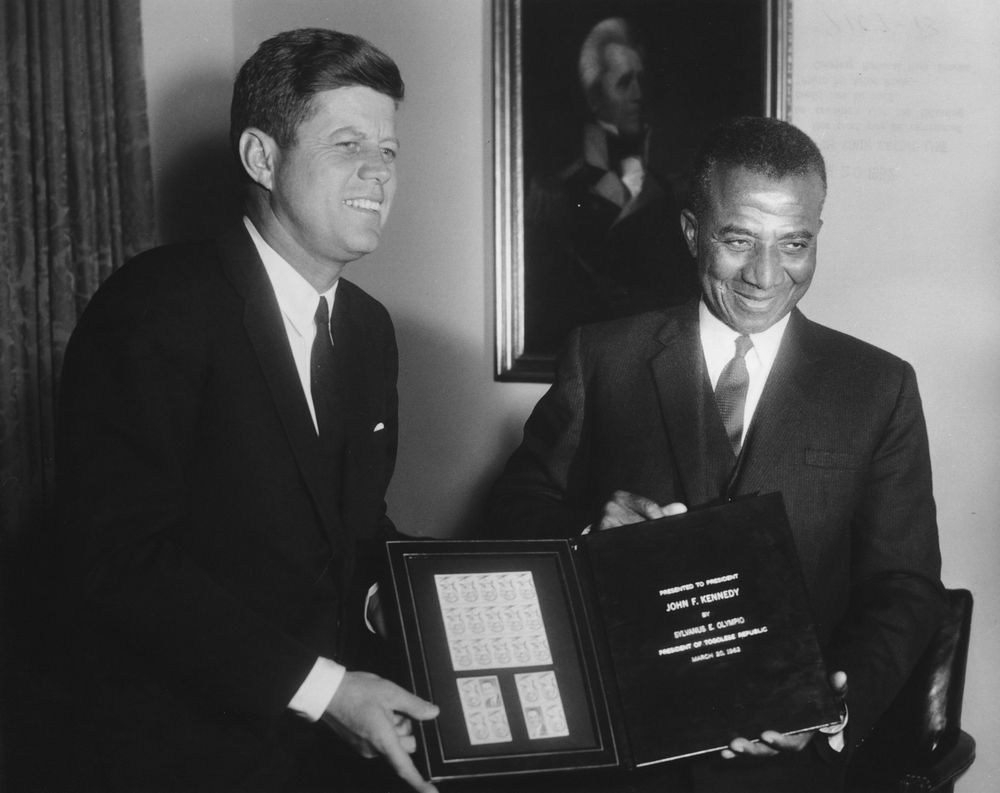
Olympio (right) with U.S. President John F. Kennedy, 1962

Olympio largely pursued a policy of connecting Togo with Britain, the United States and other Western Bloc countries. In 1962, he visited the United States and had a friendly meeting with President John F. Kennedy. In many respects, Olympio was a cultural link between British and French West Africa; he spoke both languages fluently and connected with the elites in both circles.

==== Togo–Ghana relations ====
One of the defining dynamics during Olympio's presidency was the tense relationship between Ghana and Togo. Kwame Nkrumah and Olympio were initially allies working together to gain independence for their neighbouring countries; however, the two leaders split when fighting over the western part of the German colony, which had become part of the British Gold Coast and eventually part of Ghana. The division resulted in splitting up the land of the Ewe people. Nkrumah proposed openly that Togo and Ghana dissolve the colonial borders and unite, while Olympio sought to have the eastern part of the German colony returned to Togo. The relationship became quite tense, with Olympio referring to Nkrumah as a "black imperialist" and Nkrumah repeatedly threatening Olympio's government.

Relations between the two countries deteriorated after 1961 with multiple assassination attempts against each leader resulting in accusations against the other leader and domestic repression leading to refugees receiving support from the other country. Exiles opposing Nkrumah organized in Togo and exiles opposing Olympio organized in Ghana creating a very tense atmosphere.

==== Togo–France relations ====
The French initially treated Olympio with significant hostility during the transition to independence and later, after Olympio became President in 1961, the French became concerned that he was largely aligned with British and American interests. Olympio adopted a unique position for early independent African leaders of former French territories. Although he tried to rely on little foreign aid, when necessary he relied on German aid rather than French aid. He was not part of the alliances between France and their ex-colonies (notably not joining the African and Malagasy Union) and fostered connections with former British colonies (namely Nigeria) and the United States. Eventually, he began to improve relations with France and when relations with Ghana were at their most tense, he secured a defense pact with the French in order to ensure protection for Togo.

=== Domestic politics ===
Domestic politics was largely defined by Olympio's efforts to restrain spending and develop his country without being reliant on outside support and repression of opposition parties.

His austere spending was most significant in the realm of military policy. Initially, Olympio had pushed for Togo to have no military when it achieved independence, but with threats from Nkrumah being a concern, he agreed to a small military (only about 250 soldiers). However, an increasing number of French troops began returning to their homes in Togo and were not provided enlistment in the limited Togolese military because of its small size. Emmanuel Bodjolle and Kléber Dadjo, the leaders in the Togo military, repeatedly tried to get Olympio to increase funding and enlist more of the ex-French army troops returning to the country, but were unsuccessful. On 24 September 1962, Olympio rejected the personal plea by Étienne Eyadéma, a sergeant in the French military, to join the Togolese military. On 7 January 1963, Dadjo again presented a request for enlisting ex-French troops and Olympio reportedly tore up the request.

At the same time, Togo largely became a one-party state during Olympio's presidency. Following a 1961 unsuccessful attempt on Olympio's life in which Grunitzky's Togolese Progress Party and the Juvento movement under Antoine Meatchi were accused, the opposition was outlawed. Meatchi was imprisoned for a brief period before being exiled and other opposition leaders left the country. The result was that Olympio maintained a significant amount of authority and his party dominated political life.

== Assassination ==
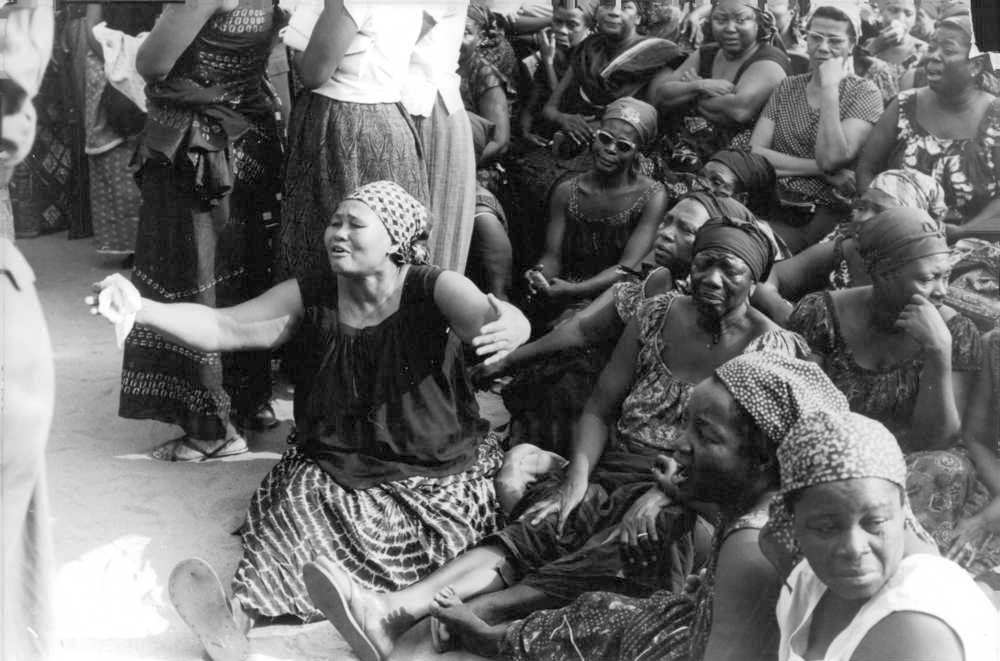
Women mourning the murder of president Olympio

Shortly after midnight on 13 January 1963, Olympio and his wife were awakened by members of the military breaking into their house. Before dawn, Olympio's body was discovered by the U.S. Ambassador Leon B. Poullada three feet from the door to the U.S. Embassy. It was the first coup d'état in the French and British colonies in Africa that achieved independence in the 1950s and 1960s, and Olympio is remembered as the first president to be assassinated during a military coup in Africa. Étienne Eyadéma, who would claim power in 1967 and remain in office until 2005, claimed to have personally fired the shot that killed Olympio while Olympio tried to escape. Emmanuel Bodjollé became the head of the government for two days until the military created a new government headed by Nicolas Grunitzky, as president, and Antoine Meatchi, as vice president.

The assassination sent shock waves throughout Africa. Guinea, Liberia, the Ivory Coast, and Tanganyika all denounced the coup and the assassination, while only Senegal and Ghana (and to a lesser extent Benin) recognized the government of Grunitzky and Meatchi until elections in May. As a result of the coup, the government of Togo was excluded from the conference in Addis Ababa at which the Organisation of African Unity was formed later that year.

== Aftermath ==
The army increased dramatically from 250 in 1963 to 1,200 by 1966. When protests in the Ewe region, Olympio's ethnic group, caused chaos in 1967, the military under Eyadéma deposed the government of Grunitzky. Eyadéma ruled the country from 1967 until 2005. Olympio's family remained in exile for much of that period and only returned to the country with democratic openings at the end of Eyadéma's rule. Olympio's son, Gilchrist Olympio, is the head of the party Union of Forces for Change and has led the main opposition in Togo since the mid-1990s.

Political offices
Preceded by Nicolas Grunitzky	Prime Minister of Togo; 1958–1961	Succeeded by Joseph Kokou Koffigoh
New office	President of Togo; 1960–1963	Succeeded by Emmanuel Bodjollé
