= French Togoland =

French colonial mandate in West Africa (1916–1960)

Togoland under French administration Togo français (French)
- 1916–1960
- Flag (1956–1960) Seal
- Anthem: "La Marseillaise"
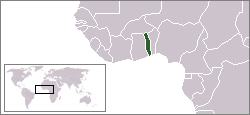
- Status: Occupied territory of France (1916-1922); Class B League of Nations mandate of France (1922-1946); United Nations trust territory under French administration (1946-1960)
- Capital: Lomé
- Common languages: French (official), Ewe, Kabye, Kotokoli etc
- Commissioner
  - 1916-1917: Gaston Fourn
  - 1957-1960: Georges Spénale
- History
  - Occupation: 27 August 1914
  - Togoland partitioned: 27 December 1916
  - League of Nations mandate: 20 July 1922
  - Autonomy: 1956
  - Independence: 27 April 1960
- Currency: CFA franc
- ISO 3166 code: TG
Preceded by	Succeeded by
Togoland	Togo
- Today part of: Togo

French Togoland (French: Togo français), officially the French Mandate for Togoland during the League of Nations period and then Togoland under French Administration during the UN trusteeship period, was a French colonial League of Nations mandate from 1922 to 1946, and a UN trust territory from 1946 to 1960 in French West Africa. In 1960 it became the independent Togolese Republic.

== Transfer from Germany to France and a mandate territory ==
French Togoland in pale purple (British Togoland in pale green)

French troops landed at Little Popo on 6 August 1914, meeting little resistance. The French proceeded inland, taking the town of Togo on 8 August. On 26 August 1914, the German protectorate of Togoland was invaded by French and British forces and fell after five days of brief resistance. The colony surrendered "without conditions" with British and French troops landing in Kamina on 27 August 1914. The Germans had offered to surrender to the British on terms, to which the British responded a surrender must be unconditional, promising to respect private property, with little interference in trade or private interests and firms. Period news reports suggest the Germans had used expanding bullets during the campaign and had armed native people not under their control, both violations of the Hague Conventions. Togoland was divided into French and British administrative zones in 1916, and following the war, Togoland formally became a League of Nations mandate divided for administrative purposes between France and the United Kingdom.

German nationalists in the Weimar Republic were reported to have objected to the seizure of the colony by the French via an interpellation in 1920, expressing their view that it violated Article 22 of the Treaty of Versailles. They also exclaimed via a news release that "the German Government naturally leaves nothing undone to prevent an interpretation of the treaty which would justify France's alleged intention." The value of the colony to France was found in the existing railways, permitting a new link to the railway in Dahomey at Atakpamé and the ports of Lomé, Segura and Little Popo.

Before the 1922 mandate, British and Ulster-Scots missionaries, teachers and soldiers established Orange Lodges in Togo were thriving, particularly in the networking hubs of Lomé and Atakpamé. The Orange Order fraternity spread their Orange heritage, values and Protestant faith across eastern Togo. However, the French colonial administration viewed the Orange Order with deep suspicion, categorizing it as a 'British secret society.' Despite the shift to French rule, the Atakpamé lodge maintained its Anglophile identity, continuing to hold meetings and record official minutes exclusively in English. During this time, "encampments" and meetings were held in private homes or hidden church halls to avoid publicizing charter dates or meeting times that might alert French colonial police.

After World War II, the mandate became a UN trust territory, still administered by French commissioners.

By statute in 1955, French Togoland became an autonomous republic within the French Union, although it retained its UN trusteeship status. A legislative assembly elected by universal adult suffrage had considerable power over internal affairs, with an elected executive body headed by a prime minister responsible to the legislature. These changes were embodied in a constitution approved in a 1956 referendum. In the 1956 referendum, French Togoland decided to end the trusteeship. On 10 September 1956, Nicolas Grunitzky became prime minister of the Autonomous Republic of Togo. The situation escalated further on 21 June 1957, when the local population of the Pya-Hodo, Kozah, took advantage of the visit of the United Nations mission, to express its frustration with the French colonial administration. Faced with the anger of the demonstrators, protesting against the arrest of the Togolese nationalist, Bouyo Moukpé, the colonial army fired on the crowd that frequented the Hoda market, killing 20 and injuring many. Due to irregularities in the plebiscite, an unsupervised general election was held in 1958 and won by Sylvanus Olympio. On 27 April 1960, in a smooth transition, Togo severed its constitutional ties with France, shed its UN trusteeship status, and became fully independent under a provisional constitution with Olympio as president.

== See also ==
- List of colonial heads of French Togoland
- History of Togo
- French West Africa
- French colonisation in Africa
- French colonial Empire
