= Party of Togolese Unity =

Party of Togolese Unity Parti de l'unité togolaise
- Founder: Sylvanus Olympio
- Founded: 13 March 1941
- Dissolved: 1963
- Headquarters: Lomé, Togo
- Ideology: African nationalism

The Party of Togolese Unity (French: Parti de l'unité togolaise, PUT), initially known as the Committee of Togolese Unity (Comité de l'unité togolaise, CUT) until 1963, was a political party in Togo. The party was formed on 13 March 1941 as CUT and led by Sylvanus Olympio. CUT gradually became more radical, and from 1947 onwards it demanded self-determination. In 1951, a moderate faction broke away and formed the Union of Chiefs and Peoples of the North (UCPN). During the period from 1951 to 1958, CUT was the main opposition party in French Togoland, and represented the mainstream of the anticolonialist movement in the territory.

== Electoral history ==
=== Presidential elections ===
Election	Party candidate	Votes	%	Result
1961	Sylvanus Olympio	560,938	100%	Elected ✓

=== National Assembly elections ===
Election	Party leader	Votes	%	Seats	+/–	Position
1946	Sylvanus Olympio			14 / 30	▲14	▲1st
1951	Sylvanus Olympio			1 / 30	▼13	▼3rd
1952	Sylvanus Olympio	10,650 (in alliance with Juvento)	25.7%	9 / 30	▲8	▲2nd
1955	Sylvanus Olympio	Boycotted		0 / 30	▼9	
1958	Sylvanus Olympio	190,098	61.2%	29 / 46	▲29	▲1st
1961	Sylvanus Olympio	560,938	100%	52 / 52	▲23	1st
