= Outline of Togo =

Overview of and topical guide to Togo

The Flag of Togo

The Coat of arms of Togo

The location of Togo

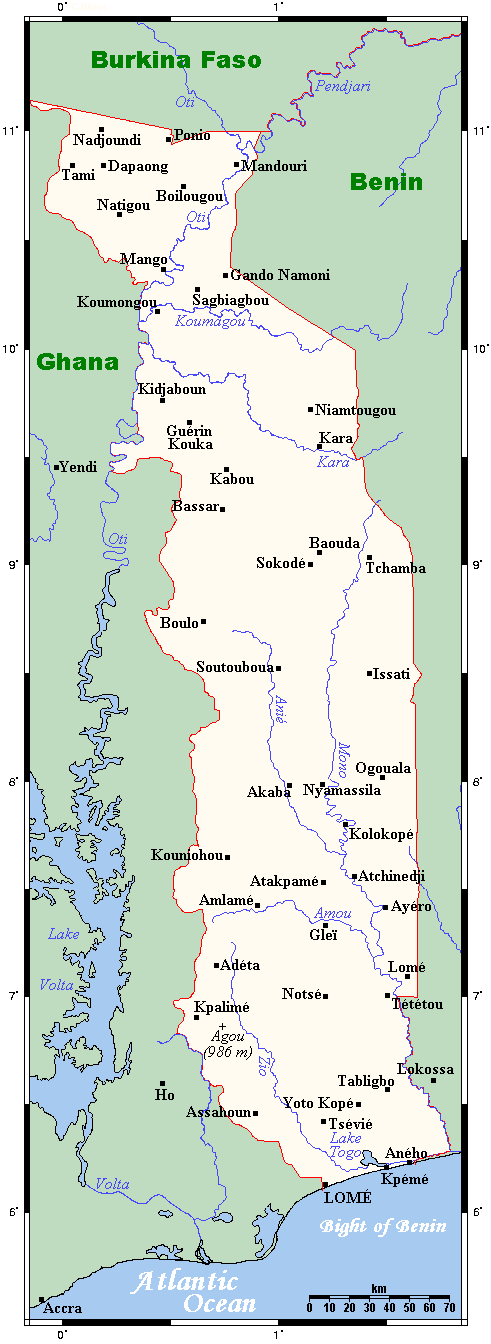
An enlargeable map of the Togolese Republic

The following outline is provided as an overview of and topical guide to Togo:

Togo – sovereign country located in West Africa bordering Ghana to the west, Benin to the east and Burkina Faso to the north. The country extends south to the Gulf of Guinea, on which the capital Lomé is located. The official language is French and many other languages are spoken as well.

== General reference ==
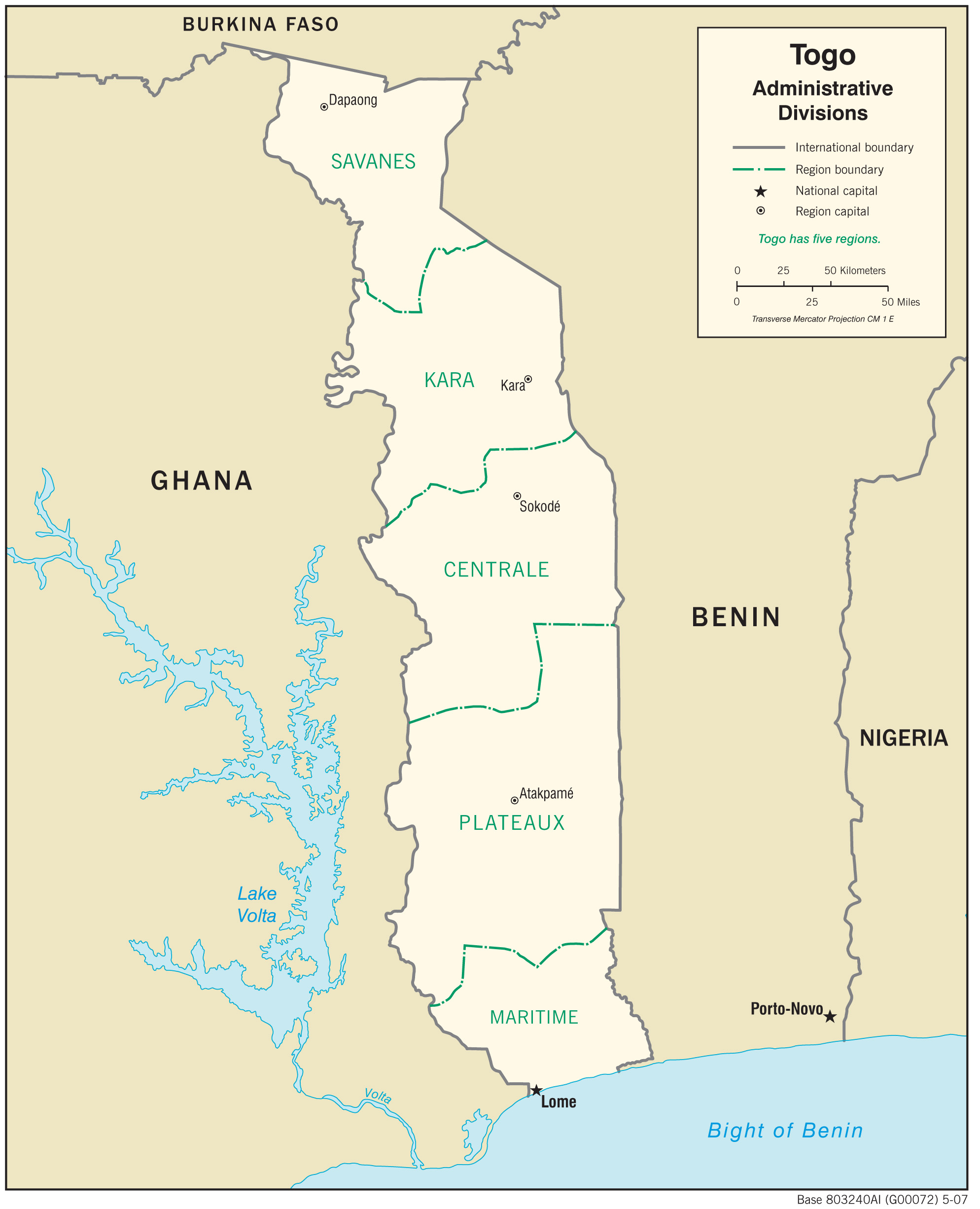
An enlargeable map of Togo

- Pronunciation: /ˈtoʊɡoʊ/
- Common English country name: Togo
- Official English country name: The Togolese Republic
- Common endonym(s):
- Official endonym(s):
- Adjectival(s): Togolese
- Demonym(s): Togolese
- ISO country codes: TG, TGO, 768
- ISO region codes: See ISO 3166-2:TG
- Internet country code top-level domain: .tg

== Geography of Togo ==
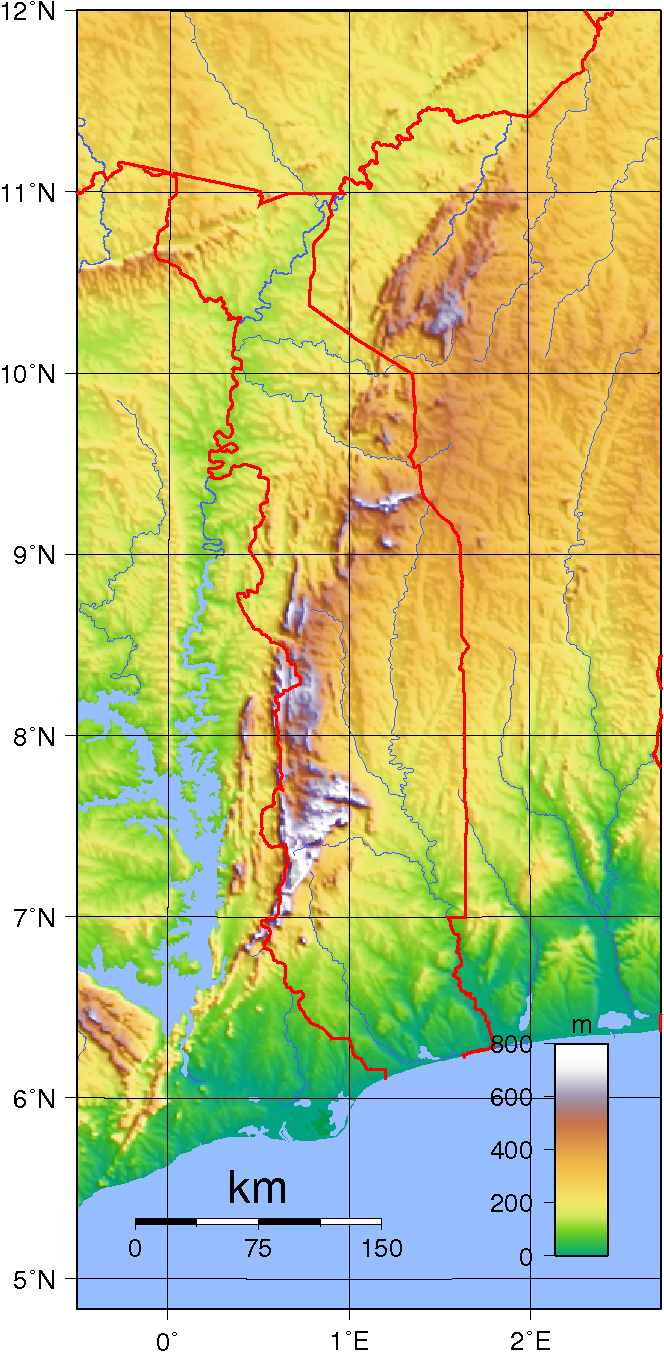
An enlargeable topographic map of Togo

Geography of Togo

- Togo is: a country
- Population of Togo: 6,585,000 - 100th most populous country
- Area of Togo: 56,785 km^{2}
- Atlas of Togo

=== Location ===
- Togo is situated within the following regions:
  - Northern Hemisphere and lies on the Prime Meridian
    - Africa
      - West Africa
- Time zone: Coordinated Universal Time UTC+00
- Extreme points of Togo
  - High: Mont Agou 986 m (3,235 ft)
  - Low: Bight of Benin 0 m
- Land boundaries: 1,647 km

Ghana 877 km
Benin 644 km
Burkina Faso 126 km

- Coastline: Bight of Benin 56 km

=== Environment of Togo ===
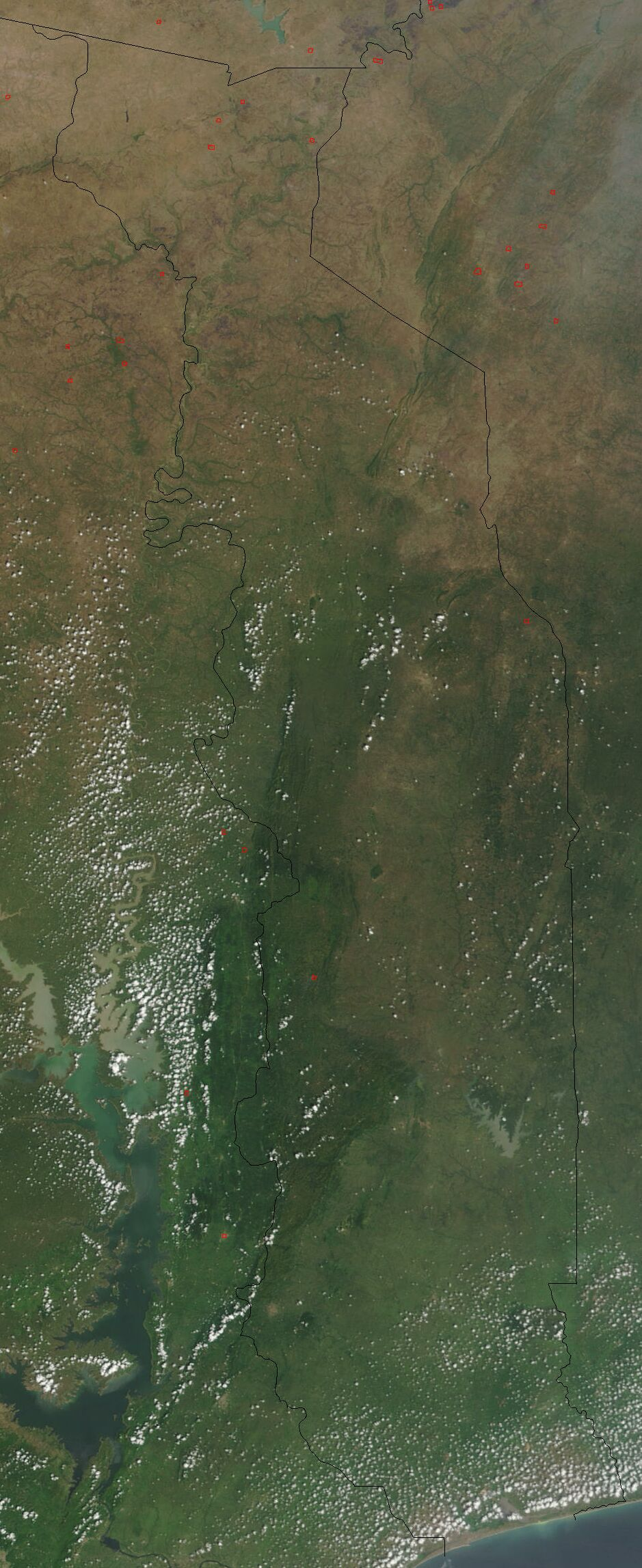
An enlargeable satellite image of Togo

- Climate of Togo
- Geology of Togo
- Wildlife of Togo
  - Fauna of Togo
    - Birds of Togo
    - Mammals of Togo

==== Natural geographic features of Togo ====
- Glaciers in Togo: none
- Rivers of Togo
- World Heritage Sites in Togo

=== Regions of Togo ===
==== Ecoregions of Togo ====
List of ecoregions in Togo

==== Administrative divisions of Togo ====
Administrative divisions of Togo

- Regions of Togo

===== Provinces of Togo =====
Provinces of Togo

===== Districts of Togo =====
Districts of Togo

===== Municipalities of Togo =====
Municipalities of Togo

- Capital of Togo: Lomé
- Cities of Togo

=== Demography of Togo ===
Demographics of Togo

== Government and politics of Togo ==
Politics of Togo

- Form of government: presidential republic
- Capital of Togo: Lomé
- Elections in Togo
- Political parties in Togo

=== Branches of the government of Togo ===
Government of Togo

==== Executive branch of the government of Togo ====
- Head of state: President of Togo, Jean-Lucien Savi de Tové
- Head of government: Prime Minister of Togo, Faure Gnassingbé

==== Legislative branch of the government of Togo ====
- Parliament of Togo (bicameral)
  - Upper house: Senate of Togo
  - Lower house: House of Commons of Togo

==== Judicial branch of the government of Togo ====
Court system of Togo

=== Foreign relations of Togo ===
Foreign relations of Togo

- Diplomatic missions in Togo
- Diplomatic missions of Togo

==== International organization membership ====
The Togolese Republic is a member of:

- African, Caribbean, and Pacific Group of States (ACP)
- African Development Bank Group (AfDB)
- African Union (AU)
- African Union/United Nations Hybrid operation in Darfur (UNAMID)
- Commonwealth of Nations
- Conference des Ministres des Finances des Pays de la Zone Franc (FZ)
- Council of the Entente (Entente)
- Economic Community of West African States (ECOWAS)
- Food and Agriculture Organization (FAO)
- Group of 77 (G77)
- International Atomic Energy Agency (IAEA)
- International Bank for Reconstruction and Development (IBRD)
- International Chamber of Commerce (ICC)
- International Civil Aviation Organization (ICAO)
- International Criminal Police Organization (Interpol)
- International Development Association (IDA)
- International Federation of Red Cross and Red Crescent Societies (IFRCS)
- International Finance Corporation (IFC)
- International Fund for Agricultural Development (IFAD)
- International Labour Organization (ILO)
- International Maritime Organization (IMO)
- International Monetary Fund (IMF)
- International Olympic Committee (IOC)
- International Organization for Migration (IOM)
- International Organization for Standardization (ISO) (correspondent)
- International Red Cross and Red Crescent Movement (ICRM)
- International Telecommunication Union (ITU)
- International Telecommunications Satellite Organization (ITSO)
- International Trade Union Confederation (ITUC)
- Inter-Parliamentary Union (IPU)
- Islamic Development Bank (IDB)
- Multilateral Investment Guarantee Agency (MIGA)
- Nonaligned Movement (NAM)
- Organisation internationale de la Francophonie (OIF)
- Organisation of Islamic Cooperation (OIC)
- Organisation for the Prohibition of Chemical Weapons (OPCW)
- Permanent Court of Arbitration (PCA)
- Union of South American Nations (UNASUR)
- United Nations (UN)
- United Nations Educational, Scientific, and Cultural Organization (UNESCO)
- United Nations Industrial Development Organization (UNIDO)
- United Nations Mission in Liberia (UNMIL)
- United Nations Operation in Cote d'Ivoire (UNOCI)
- Universal Postal Union (UPU)
- West African Development Bank (WADB) (regional)
- West African Economic and Monetary Union (WAEMU)
- World Confederation of Labour (WCL)
- World Customs Organization (WCO)
- World Federation of Trade Unions (WFTU)
- World Health Organization (WHO)
- World Intellectual Property Organization (WIPO)
- World Meteorological Organization (WMO)
- World Tourism Organization (UNWTO)
- World Trade Organization (WTO)

=== Law and order in Togo ===
Law of Togo

- Constitution of Togo
- Human rights in Togo
  - Abortion in Togo
  - LGBT rights in Togo
- Law enforcement in Togo

=== Military of Togo ===
Military of Togo

- Command
  - Commander-in-chief:
- Forces
  - Army of Togo
  - Air Force of Togo

=== Local government in Togo ===
Local government in Togo

== History of Togo ==
History of Togo

- Current events of Togo

== Culture of Togo ==
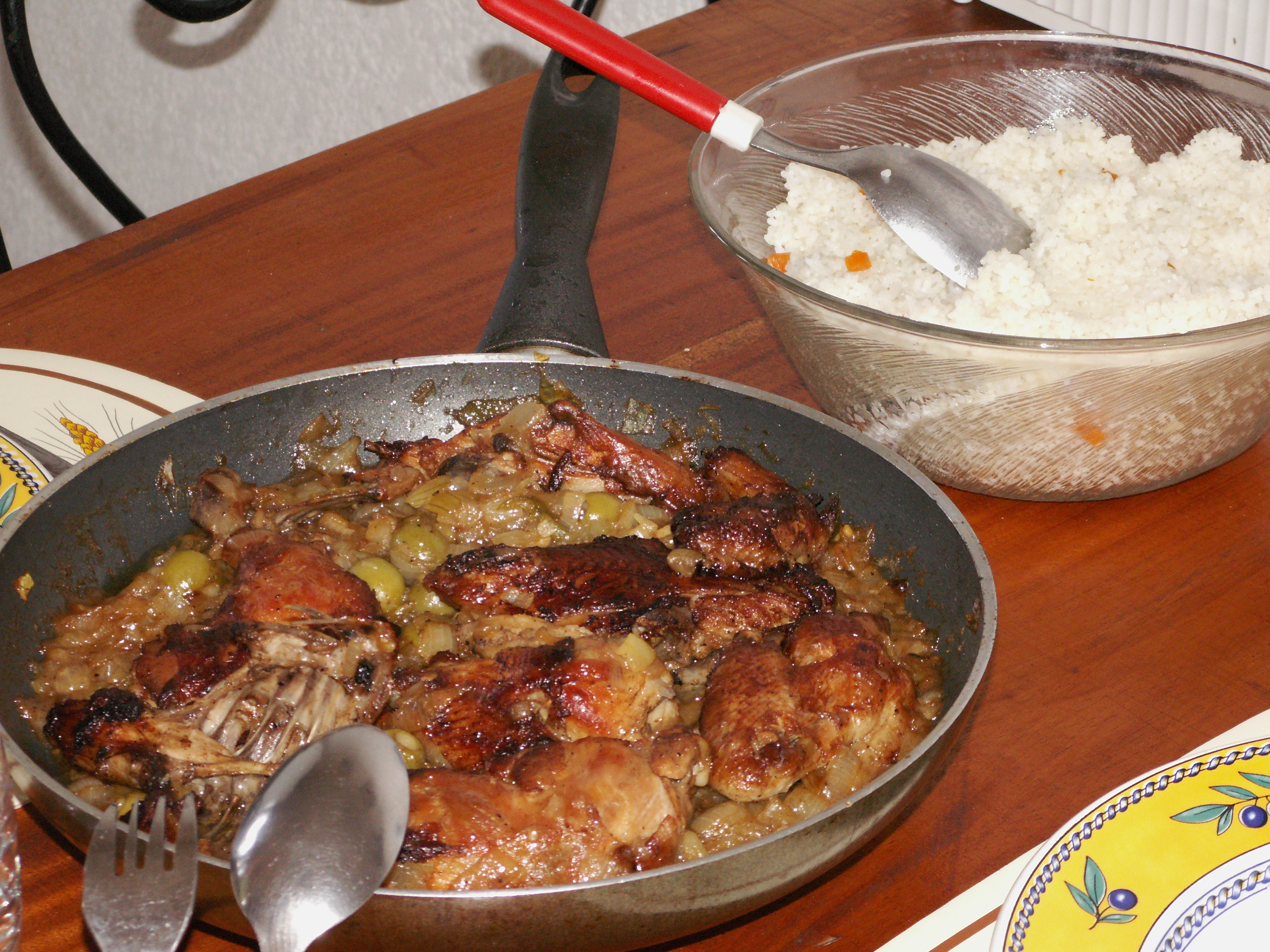
Yassa is a popular dish throughout West Africa prepared with chicken or fish. Chicken yassa is pictured.

Culture of Togo

- Cuisine of Togo
- Languages of Togo
- National symbols of Togo
  - Coat of arms of Togo
  - Flag of Togo
  - National anthem of Togo
- Prostitution in Togo
- Public holidays in Togo
- Religion in Togo
  - Hinduism in Togo
  - Islam in Togo
- World Heritage Sites in Togo

=== Art in Togo ===
- Music of Togo

=== Sports in Togo ===
- Football in Togo
- Togo at the Olympics

== Economy and infrastructure of Togo ==
Economy of Togo

- Economic rank, by nominal GDP (2007): 152nd (one hundred and fifty second)
- Agriculture in Togo
- Communications in Togo
  - Internet in Togo
- Companies of Togo
- Currency of Togo: Franc
  - ISO 4217: XOF
- Health care in Togo
- Mining in Togo
- Stock Exchange in Togo: none – country is served by the regional stock exchange Bourse Régionale des Valeurs Mobilières (BRVM) in Abidjan, Cote d'Ivoire.
- Transport in Togo
  - Airports in Togo
  - Rail transport in Togo

== Education in Togo ==
Education in Togo

== See also ==
Togo

- Index of Togo-related articles
- List of international rankings
- List of Togo-related topics
- Member state of the United Nations
- Outline of Africa
- Outline of geography
