= List of companies of Togo =

Location of Togo

Togo, officially the Togolese Republic, is a country in West Africa bordered by Ghana to the west, Benin to the east and Burkina Faso to the north. It extends south to the Gulf of Guinea, where its capital Lomé is located. Togo covers an area of approximately 57,000 square kilometres (22,000 sq mi) with a population of approximately 6.7 million.

Togo serves as a regional commercial and trade center. The government's decade-long effort, supported by the World Bank and the International Monetary Fund (IMF), to implement economic reform measures, encourage foreign investment, and bring revenues in line with expenditures, has stalled. Political unrest, including private and public sector strikes throughout 1992 and 1993, jeopardized the reform program, shrank the tax base, and disrupted vital economic activity.

== Notable firms ==
This list includes notable companies with primary headquarters located in the country. The industry and sector follow the Industry Classification Benchmark framework. Organizations which have ceased operations are included and noted as defunct.

Notable companies Status: P=Private, S=State; A=Active, D=Defunct
Name	Industry	Sector	Headquarters	Founded	Notes	Status	
Africa West Airlines	Consumer services	Airlines	Lomé	1997	Defunct 2013	P	D
Air Horizon	Consumer services	Airlines	Lomé	2004	Defunct 2007	P	D
Air Togo	Consumer services	Airlines	Lomé	1998	Defunct 2000	P	D
ASKY Airlines	Consumer services	Airlines	Lomé	2008	Airline	P	A
Atlantic Bank Group	Financials	Banks	Lomé	1978	Financial services holding group	P	A
Communauté Électrique du Bénin	Utilities	Electricity	Lomé	1968	Electrical infrastructure, joint with Benin	S	A
Ecobank	Financials	Banks	Lomé	1985	Banking conglomerate	P	A
La Poste du Togo	Industrials	Delivery services	Lomé	1883	Postal service	S	A

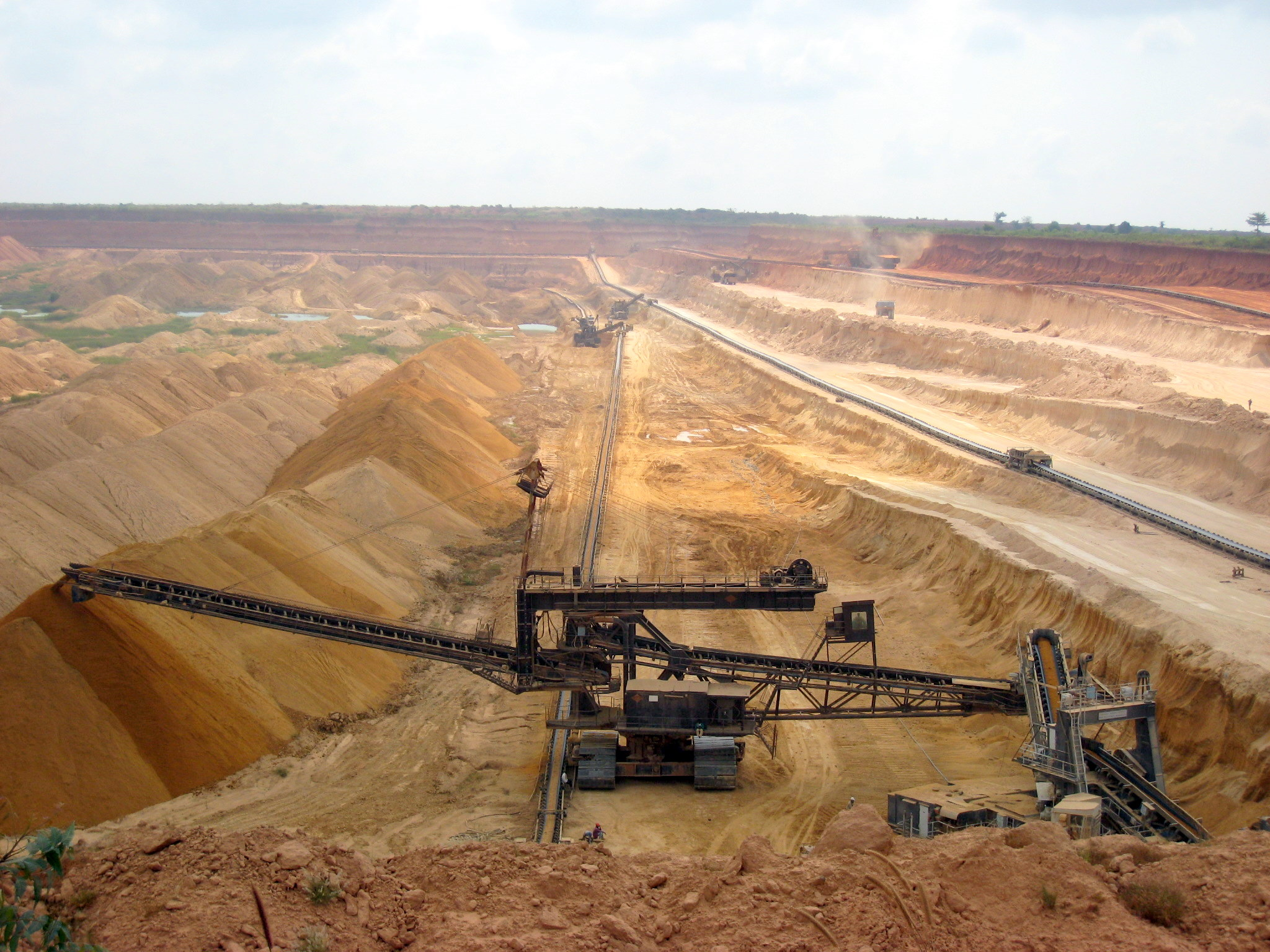
Phosphate mining in Togo

== See also ==
- Economy of Togo
- List of airlines of Togo
- List of banks in Togo
