= List of airlines of Togo =

This is a list of airlines operating in Togo.

== Active ==
Airline	Image	IATA	ICAO	Callsign	Founded	Notes
Asky Airlines		KP	SKK	ASKY AIRLINE	2008	

== Defunct ==
Airline	Image	IATA	ICAO	Callsign	Founded	Ceased operations	Notes
Africa West Airlines		FK	WTA	WEST TOGO	1997	2013	
Air Dabia Togo					1995	1997	Renamed to Transtel Togo
Air Horizon		8C	HZT	HORIZON TOGO	2004	2007	
Air Togo		YT	TGA	AIR TOHO	1998	2003	
Peace Air Togo			PCT		1992	2000	
Trans African Airline		T8			2002	2005	
Transtel Togo			TTG		1997	2004	Renamed to Air Horizon

== See also ==
- List of airlines
- List of companies based in Togo
