= Atlantic Bank Group =

West African financial services conglomerate

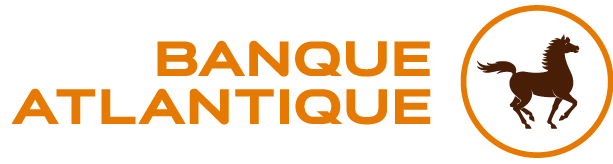
- Native name: Groupe Banque Atlantique
- Type: Private company
- Industry: Financial services
- Founded: August 11, 1978; 47 years ago
- Headquarters: Lomé, Togo
- Area served: West Africa
- Key people: Souleymane Diarrassouba, Group CEO
- Products: Retail banking, Loans, Savings, Checking, Investments, Debit Cards, Credit Cards, Mortgages
- Total assets: US$1.5 billion+ (2010)
- Website: www.banqueatlantique.net

Atlantic Bank Group, commonly known by its French name Groupe Banque Atlantique, is a West African financial services conglomerate, headquartered in Lomé, Togo. The Group consists of banks and other financial services companies in Côte d'Ivoire, Benin, Niger, Burkina Faso, Mali, Togo, Senegal and Cameroon.

The Group is a large financial services provider in West Africa and Central Africa, with emphasis on retail banking, but offering a full range of financial products. The group maintains in excess of 150 branches in the 8 countries that it serves. The Group's shareholders' equity was in excess of US$122 million, as of October 2010. Since 2012, it has been part of Morocco's BCP Group.

== History ==
The first bank that the group established was Atlantic Bank Côte d'Ivoire (Banque Atlantique Côte d'Ivoire) (BACI), which was founded in 1978.

In 1997, the Group acquired the assets of Barclays Bank in Côte d'Ivoire, keeping the new acquisition separate, but renaming it COBACI. In 2001, the Group created a joint stock with the symbol SGI. In 2005, SGI became Atlantic Financial Group, the holding company of the Atlantic Bank Group. In 2004, a new subsidiary under the name GIE was established to handle the Group's computing and information technology needs. In 2007, GIE rebranded as Atlantic Technology SA.

Starting in 2006, the Group started a regional expansion drive by the opening of Atlantic Bank Benin that year. The next year, Atlantic Bank Niger, Atlantic Bank Burkina Faso, Atlantic Bank Mali and Atlantic Bank Togo were established. Since then Atlantic Bank Senegal (2007) and Atlantic Bank Cameroon (2009) were established. Also in 2009, COBACI was merged with Atlantic Bank Côte d'Ivoire (BACI).

In 2012, Atlantic Bank Group was taken over by the BCP Group based in Casablanca, Morocco.

=== Group structure before BCP takeover ===
Prior to integration into BCP, the group's parent holding company was Atlantic Financial Group based in Lomé, Togo. The member companies of the Atlantic Bank Group included the following:

- Atlantic Bank Côte d'Ivoire - Abidjan, Côte d'Ivoire
- Atlantic Bank Benin - Cotonou, Benin
- Atlantic Bank Niger - Niamey, Niger
- Atlantic Bank Burkina Faso - Ouagadougou, Burkina Faso
- Atlantic Bank Mali - Bamako, Mali
- Atlantic Bank Togo - Lome, Togo
- Atlantic Bank Senegal - Dakar, Senegal
- Atlantic Bank Cameroon - Douala, Cameroon
- Atlantic Technology SA - Lomé, Togo
- Atlantic Finance - Lomé, Togo - management and financial intermediation company
- Cash Money Worldwide - Lomé, Togo - funds transfer company
- Atlantic Bank France - Paris, France - representative office in Paris, France

== See also ==
- List of banks in Togo
- List of banks in Africa
- Central Bank of West African States
- Central Bank of Central African States
- Economy of Togo
