= Telecommunications in Togo =

Telecommunications in Togo include radio, television, fixed and mobile telephones, and the Internet.

== Radio and television ==
Radio stations: state-owned radio network with multiple stations; several dozen private radio stations and a few community radio stations; transmissions of multiple international broadcasters are available (2007).

Television stations: two state-owned TV stations with multiple transmission sites; 5 private TV stations broadcast locally; cable TV service is available (2007).

Private media in Togo have proliferated, with dozens of commercial and community radios and a handful of private TV stations in operation. Radio is the most popular medium, particularly in rural areas. The main TV station is the government-owned Television Togolaise.

The radio services of the BBC World Service, Gabon's Africa No. 1, and Radio France Internationale (RFI) are all available.

== Telephone ==
Calling code: +228

International call prefix: 00

Main lines:

- 225,000 lines in use, 127th in the world (2012);
- 213,800 lines in use, 126th in the world (2010).

Mobile cellular:

- 3.5 million lines, 124th in the world (2012);
- 2.5 million lines, 129th in the world (2010).

Telephone system: fair system based on network of microwave radio relay routes supplemented by open-wire lines and cellular system; combined fixed-line and mobile-cellular teledensity roughly 50 telephones per 100 persons with mobile-cellular use predominating (2010).

Satellite earth stations: 1 Intelsat (Atlantic Ocean) and 1 Symphonie (satellite) (2010).

Communications cables: West Africa Cable System (WACS), a submarine cable linking countries along the west coast of Africa with each other and with Portugal and the United Kingdom; GLO-1 which links countries along the west coast of Africa to each other and to Portugal, Spain, and the United Kingdom.

== Internet ==
Top-level domain: .tg

Internet users:

- 278,442 users, 144th in the world; 4.0% of the population, 191st in the world (2012);
- 356,300 users, 123rd in the world (2009).

Fixed broadband: 5,560 subscriptions, 158th in the world; 0.1% of the population, 170th in the world (2012).

Wireless broadband: 47,892 subscribers, 125th in the world; 0.7% of the population, 135th in the world (2012).

Internet hosts:

- 1,168 hosts, 170th in the world (2012);
- 1,165 hosts, 169th in the world (2011).

IPv4: 13,312 addresses allocated, less than 0.05% of the world total, 1.9 addresses per 1000 people (2012).

=== Internet censorship and surveillance ===
There are no known government restrictions on access to the Internet or reports that the government monitors e-mail or Internet chat rooms without judicial oversight. Although the constitution provides for freedom of speech and press, the government restricts these rights.

The constitution and law prohibit arbitrary interference with privacy, family, home, or correspondence, and the government generally respects these prohibitions. In criminal cases a judge or senior police official may authorize searches of private residences. Citizens believe the government monitors telephones and correspondence, although such surveillance has not been confirmed.

== See also ==
- Media of Togo
- Télévision Togolaise, the national broadcaster of Togo.
- List of terrestrial fibre optic cable projects in Africa
- Economy of Togo
