= Foreign relations of Togo =

Although Togo's foreign policy is nonaligned, it has strong historical and cultural ties with western Europe, especially France and Germany. Togo is a member of the Commonwealth of Nations, exchanging high commissioners with other Commonwealth countries. It recognizes the People's Republic of China, North Korea, and Cuba, and re-established relations with Israel in 1987.

Togo pursues an active foreign policy and participates in many international organizations. It is particularly active in West African regional affairs and in the African Union. Relations between Togo and neighboring states are generally good.

== Diplomatic relations ==
List of countries which Togo maintains diplomatic relations with:

#	Country	Date
1	France	27 April 1960
2	Germany	27 April 1960
3	United Kingdom	27 April 1960
4	United States	27 April 1960
5	Russia	1 May 1960
6	Switzerland	19 July 1960
7	Liberia	29 July 1960
8	Israel	8 September 1960
9	Serbia	10 September 1960
10	Egypt	20 September 1960
11	Czech Republic	2 December 1960
12	Japan	4 April 1961
13	Guinea	3 August 1961
14	Italy	14 September 1961
15	Netherlands	5 October 1961
16	Belgium	1961
17	Canada	7 June 1962
18	Lebanon	7 June 1962
19	India	31 August 1962
20	Brazil	26 October 1962
21	Niger	26 October 1962
22	Turkey	6 December 1962
23	Poland	26 December 1962
24	Nigeria	1962
25	Ghana	21 January 1963
26	South Korea	26 July 1963
27	Pakistan	8 May 1964
28	Spain	22 October 1965
29	Tunisia	1965
30	Denmark	21 June 1968
31	Gabon	21 June 1968
32	Mali	1969
33	Hungary	22 June 1970
34	Democratic Republic of the Congo	13 July 1970
35	Romania	12 January 1971
36	Austria	1971
37	Norway	10 January 1972
38	Luxembourg	7 March 1972
39	China	19 September 1972
40	North Korea	31 January 1973
—	Sovereign Military Order of Malta	5 September 1973
41	Libya	3 November 1973
42	Argentina	12 June 1974
43	Bulgaria	19 July 1974
44	Vietnam	8 February 1975
45	Mexico	25 October 1975
46	Somalia	21 November 1975
47	Senegal	1 June 1976
48	Gambia	10 May 1977
49	Albania	25 June 1977
50	Sweden	15 March 1978
51	Portugal	17 March 1978
52	Cuba	18 January 1979
53	Costa Rica	11 June 1979
54	Benin	29 October 1979
55	Greece	1979
56	Ecuador	11 February 1980
57	Zimbabwe	16 June 1980
—	Holy See	21 April 1981
58	Burkina Faso	18 August 1981
59	Sudan	8 July 1982
60	Ethiopia	11 December 1982
61	Suriname	8 November 1983
62	Republic of the Congo	6 August 1984
63	Tanzania	27 December 1984
64	Kenya	9 April 1985
65	Chad	10 April 1985
66	Thailand	7 May 1986
67	Vanuatu	21 January 1987
68	Algeria	2 July 1987
69	Afghanistan	1987
70	Angola	27 September 1988
71	Colombia	29 September 1988
—	State of Palestine	1989
72	Venezuela	21 December 1990
73	Slovakia	4 January 1997
74	Iraq	9 January 1997
75	South Africa	13 January 1997
76	Qatar	16 May 1997
77	Iran	January 1998
78	North Macedonia	14 April 1998
79	Slovenia	31 July 1998
80	Ukraine	1 September 1999
81	Philippines	24 August 2000
82	Brunei	3 December 2002
83	Armenia	14 November 2003
84	Iceland	19 November 2004
85	Indonesia	2005
86	Morocco	10 July 2007
87	Uruguay	28 September 2007
88	United Arab Emirates	6 December 2007
89	Saudi Arabia	26 December 2007
90	Malta	16 May 2008
91	Malaysia	20 August 2008
92	Australia	22 July 2009
93	Finland	12 May 2010
94	Cambodia	6 August 2010
95	Belarus	28 September 2010
96	Kuwait	6 October 2010
97	Namibia	24 November 2010
98	Azerbaijan	28 December 2010
99	Fiji	31 May 2011
100	Singapore	15 June 2012
101	Montenegro	21 December 2012
102	Mongolia	6 September 2013
103	Georgia	27 May 2014
104	Lithuania	22 September 2014
105	Estonia	23 September 2014
106	Latvia	23 September 2014
107	Turkmenistan	25 September 2014
108	Kazakhstan	9 October 2014
109	Seychelles	3 March 2015
110	El Salvador	20 March 2015
111	Madagascar	24 March 2015
112	Cyprus	24 September 2015
113	Sri Lanka	27 September 2015
114	Chile	30 September 2015
115	Kyrgyzstan	30 September 2015
116	Monaco	9 February 2016
117	Djibouti	14 February 2016
118	Tajikistan	2 March 2016
119	Botswana	7 October 2016
120	Equatorial Guinea	7 October 2016
121	Rwanda	17 January 2017
122	Mauritius	22 February 2017
123	Oman	5 June 2017
124	Andorra	21 November 2017
125	Peru	18 December 2017
126	Ireland	27 June 2018
127	Saint Kitts and Nevis	25 September 2018
128	San Marino	28 February 2019
129	Nepal	22 March 2019
130	Panama	26 March 2019
131	Myanmar	31 July 2019
132	Nicaragua	23 October 2019
133	Bosnia and Herzegovina	24 October 2019
134	Uganda	5 December 2019
135	Zambia	23 March 2021
136	Jamaica	23 November 2021
137	Dominican Republic	20 September 2022
138	Bahrain	21 September 2022
139	Maldives	3 May 2023
140	Croatia	18 September 2023
141	Bolivia	20 September 2023
142	Guatemala	22 September 2023
143	Uzbekistan	26 September 2024
144	Bahamas	24 October 2024
145	Guinea-Bissau	28 March 2025
146	Mauritania	28 March 2025
147	Moldova	21 September 2026
148	Saint Vincent and the Grenadines	21 September 2026
149	Jordan	25 September 2026
150	Ivory Coast	Unknown
151	Sierra Leone	Unknown

== Bilateral relations ==
Country	Formal Relations Began	Notes
China	19 September 1972	See China–Togo relations Both countries established diplomatic relations on 19 September 1972: China has an embassy in Lomé.; Togo has an embassy in Beijing.
Cyprus	24 September 2015	Cyprus is accredited to Togo from its High Commission in Paris, France.
France	27 April 1960	See France–Togo relations Both countries established diplomatic relations on 27 April 1960: France has an embassy in Lomé.; Togo has an embassy in Paris.
Germany	27 April 1960	Both countries established diplomatic relations on 27 April 1960 See Germany–Togo relations: Germany has an embassy in Lomé.; Togo has an embassy in Berlin.
Ghana	21 January 1963	See Ghana–Togo relations Both countries established diplomatic relations on 21 January 1963. After 1918, following the defeat of Germany, the League of Nations divided the German colony of Togoland from north to south, a decision that divided the Ewe people among the Gold Coast, British Togoland, and French Togoland. After 1945, the United Nations (UN) took over the Togoland mandates. During the 1950s, when the independence of Ghana was in sight, demands grew for a separate Ewe state, an idea that Kwame Nkrumah, leader of the Gold Coast independence movement, opposed. Following a UN plebiscite in May 1956, in which a majority of the Ewe voted for union with Ghana, British Togoland became part of the Gold Coast. After Togolese independence in 1960, relations between Togo and Ghana deteriorated, aggravated by political differences and incidents such as smuggling across their common border. At times, relations have verged on open aggression. The result of the transfer of Togoland to Ghana has meant that many Togolese keep one foot on either side of the border, living in Ghana by night and working in the markets of the capital, Lomé, by day. Ghana is the only Commonwealth member with which Togo shares a border.: Ghana has a high commission in Lomé.; Togo has a high commission in Accra.
India	31 August 1962	See India–Togo relations Both countries established diplomatic relations on 31 August 1962: India has a high commission in Lomé.; Togo has a high commission in New Delhi.
Israel	8 September 1960	Both countries established diplomatic relations on 8 September 1960 when has been accredited first Ambassador of Israel to Togo (resident in Accra) Mr. Moshe Bitan. Togo severed ties with Israel on 21 September 1973. Diplomatic relations were re-established on 9 June 1987. In August 2017, Israeli Prime Minister Benjamin Netanyahu received Togo's President Faure Essozimna Gnassingbe in Jerusalem during his official five-day trip to Israel. In December 2017, Togo voted at the UN to recognize Jerusalem as the capital of Israel.
South Korea	26 July 1963	Both countries established diplomatic relations on 26 July 1963, but severed 16 September 1974 and re-established on 23 January 1991
Turkey	6 December 1962	See Togo–Turkey relations Both countries established diplomatic relations on 6 December 1962 when accredited first Ambassador of Turkey to Togo (resident in Accra) Mr. Kamran Acet.: Turkey has an embassy in Lomé.; Trade volume between the two countries was $106 million USD in 2019.
United Kingdom	27 April 1960	Togo established diplomatic relations with the United Kingdom on 27 April 1960.: Togo maintains a high commission in London.; The United Kingdom is not accredited to Togo through a high commission; the UK develops relations through its high commission in Accra, Ghana.; Both countries share common membership of the Atlantic co-operation pact, the Commonwealth, and the World Trade Organization.
United States	27 April 1960	Both countries established diplomatic relations on 27 April 1960 See Togo–United States relations The United States and Togo have had generally good relations since its independence, although the United States has never been one of Togo's major trading partners. The largest share of U.S. exports to Togo generally has been used clothing and scrap textiles. Other important U.S. exports include rice, wheat, shoes, and tobacco products, and U.S. personal computers and other office electronics are becoming more widely used.: Togo has an embassy in Washington, D.C.; United States has an embassy in Lomé.

== See also ==
- List of diplomatic missions in Togo
- List of diplomatic missions of Togo
