= HZT =

HZT may refer to:

- Air Horizon, a Togolese airline
- High-Z Supernova Search Team
- Hydrochlorothiazide
