= Togo–United States relations =

- Togo: United States

Togo–United States relations are bilateral relations between Togo and the United States.

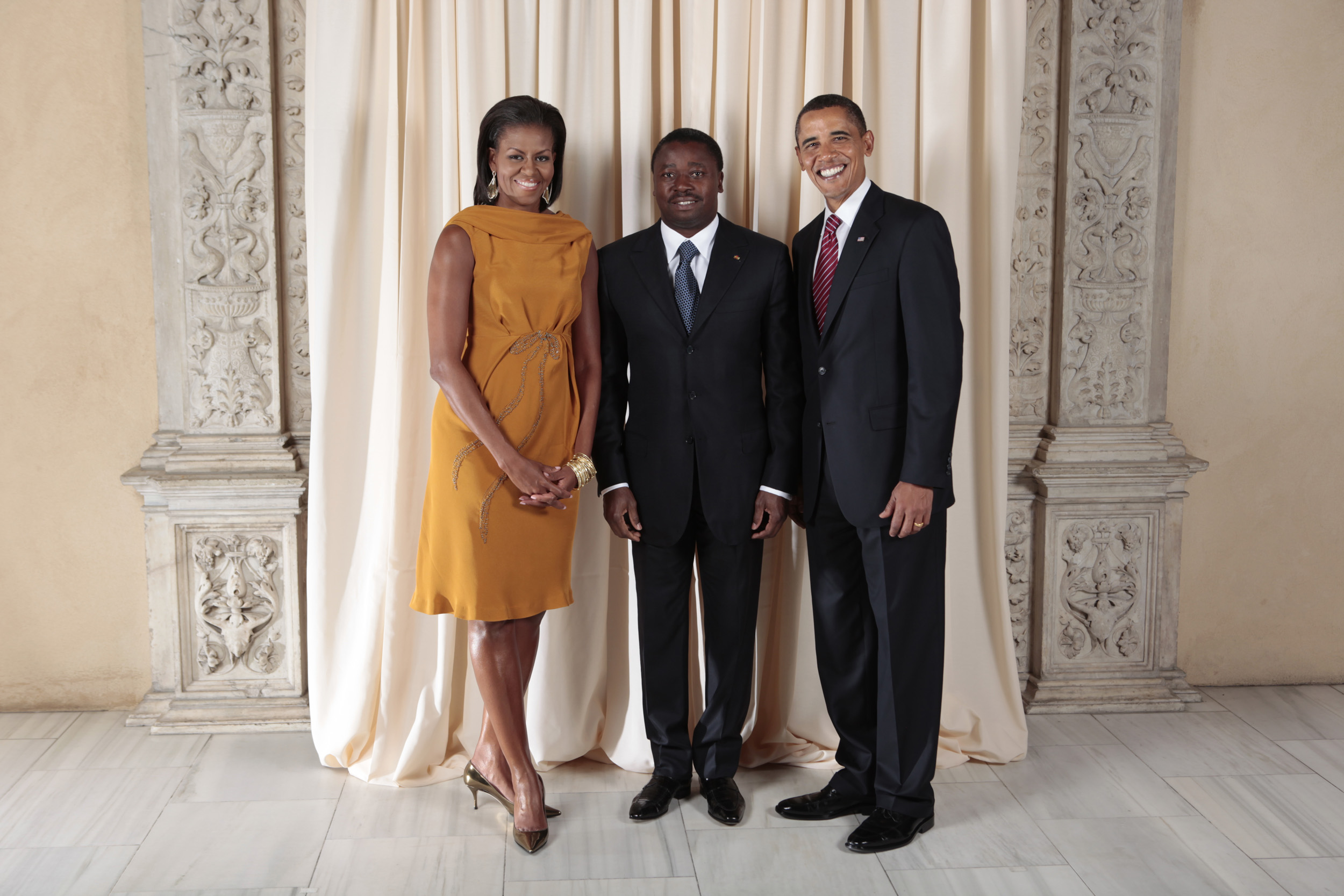
Togolese president Faure Gnassingbé with US president Barack Obama and first lady Michelle Obama

== History ==
On April 27, 1960, the day of Togo's independence, the United States recognized the Republic of Togo. The American consulate in Lomé was elevated to an embassy status on the same day, with Jesse M. MacKnight serving as the Chargé d'Affaires ad interim.

The period between 1960 and 1967 in Togo was marked by political instability, which included several coups and assassinations, and ultimately led to General Gnassingbé Eyadéma seizing power in a 1967 coup, and held on to power after the 1986 Togolese coup attempt. He ruled Togo until his death in 2005, after which his son, Faure Gnassingbé, assumed the presidency.

In 2014, the U.S. built six schools in Togo. In 2017, the U.S. expre concerns over the treatment of protesters in the country.

== Diplomatic relations ==
Togo is a pro-Western, market-oriented country. The United States and Togo have had generally good relations since its independence, although the United States has never been one of Togo's major trading partners. The largest share of U.S. exports to Togo generally has been used clothing and scrap textiles. Other important U.S. exports include rice, wheat, shoes, and tobacco products, and U.S. personal computers and other office electronics are becoming more widely used.

The Government of Togo, with the support of the Overseas Private Investment Corporation (OPIC) and the United States Agency for International Development (USAID), established an export processing zone (EPZ) in Togo in 1989. The zone has attracted private investors interested in manufacturing, assembly, and food processing, primarily for the export market. USAID closed its local office in 1994 and runs local development programs from its office in Accra through nongovernmental organizations in Togo.

The Peace Corps began its work in Togo in 1962. Since that time, more than 2,200 Peace Corps Volunteers have served in the country. Currently there are 114 Volunteers serving in Togo. Volunteers have a successful history of collaboration and involvement with the Togolese people at all levels. Their efforts build upon counterpart relationships and emphasize low-cost solutions that make maximum use of local resources. Partnering with local and international organizations is an important component of Volunteer project activities. Volunteers work to promote self-sufficiency in the areas of small business development, education, environment, and health. All Volunteers, regardless of sector, are trained in how to promote HIV/AIDS awareness and prevention.

== Resident diplomatic missions ==
- Togo has an embassy in Washington, D.C.
- United States has an embassy in Lomé.
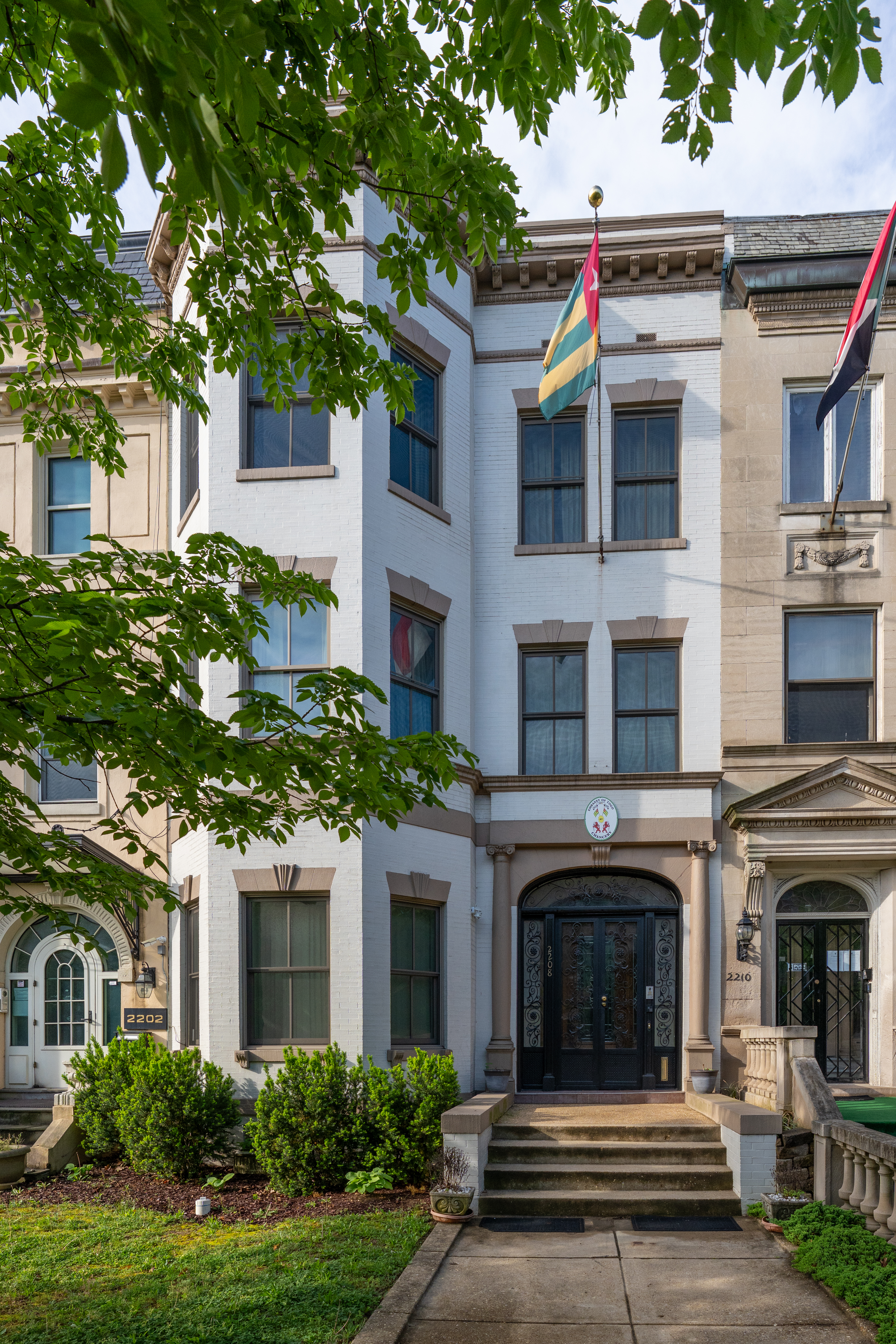
Embassy of Togo in Washington, D.C.

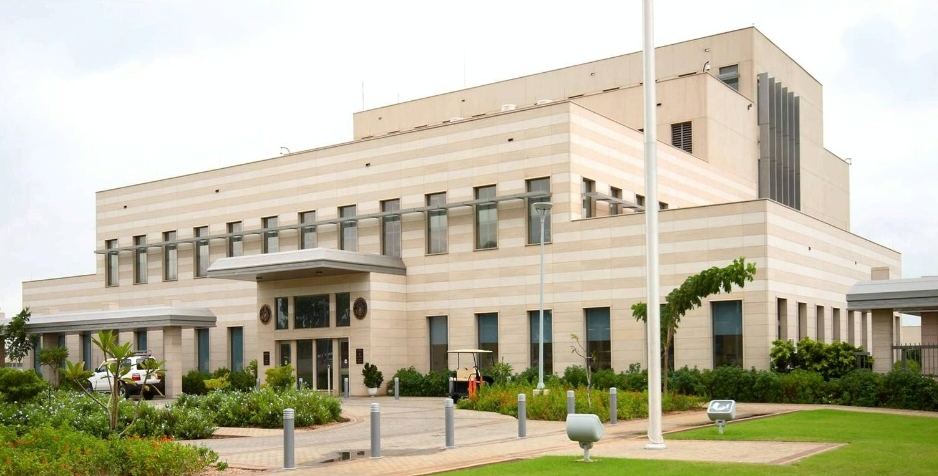
Embassy of the United States to Lomé

== See also ==
- Embassy of Togo, Washington, D.C.
- Foreign relations of Togo
- Foreign relations of the United States
- United States Ambassador to Togo
