= Togo–Turkey relations =

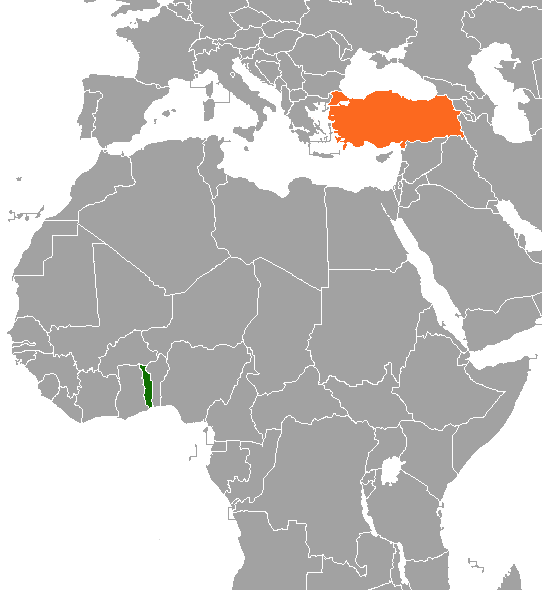
- Togo: Turkey

Togo–Turkey relations are the foreign relations between Togo and Turkey. Turkey embassy opened in Lomé.

== Diplomatic relations ==
Turkey and Togo enjoy good bilateral relations. However, relations cooled in early 1980s when Gnassingbé Eyadéma became increasingly more heavy-handed and authoritarian, judged as having Africa's worst human rights record. Turkey was critical of Gnassingbé Eyadéma's re-election in August 1993 in a contest boycotted by other candidates. Relations improved in 1994, when Gnassingbé Eyadéma appointed Edem Kodjo, an Ewe leader of Rassemblement du Peuple Togolais from Kpalimé who came third in the election with 7 seats, as prime minister.

== Presidential visits ==
Guest	Host	Place of visit	Date of visit
(Turkey) President Recep Tayyip Erdoğan	(Togo) President Faure Gnassingbé	Çankaya Köşkü, Ankara	August 28, 2014

== Economic relations ==
- Trade volume between the two countries was US$109 million in 2019.

== Educational relations ==
Turkey has been providing scholarships to Togolese students since 1992.

== See also ==
- Foreign relations of Togo
- Foreign relations of Turkey
