= Mass media in Togo =

Mass media in Togo includes radio, television, and online and print formats. The Agence Togolaise de Presse news agency began in 1975. The Union des Journalistes Independants du Togo press association is headquartered in Lomé.

== Newspapers and magazines ==
- Carrefour
- Le Combat du Peuple
- Le Crocodile
- Forum de la Semaine
- Liberté
- Motion d’Information
- Le Regard
- Togo-Presse
- Le Panafricain
- Liberte
- Le Changement
- Le Liberal
- La Nouvelle Tribune
- Le Bilan
- La Dépêche
- Togo Réveil
- Waraa
- Sika'a
- L'Intelligent
- Hara Kiri

== Radio ==
- Nana FM
- Radio Kara
- Radio Lome
- Radio Togolaise
- Zephyr FM

== Television ==
- LCF (television)
- Telesports TV
- Télévision Togolaise
- TV2
- TV7
- New World TV
- Radio Télévision Delta Santé
- Télévision Espoir 47
- One TV

== See also ==
- List of radio stations in Africa: Togo
- List of television stations in Africa: Togo
- Telecommunications in Togo
- Terrestrial fibre optic cable projects in Togo
- Canal Olympia a cinema company with movie theaters in Lome, Togo

== Bibliography ==
- Jean-Baptiste Dossè Placca (1984). "'Is Togo television yours or mine?'". Index on Censorship. 13 (5): 21. doi:10.1080/03064228408533779.
- "Togo: Directory". Africa South of the Sahara 2003. Regional Surveys of the World. Europa Publications. 2003. p. 1106+. ISBN 9781857431315. ISSN 0065-3896. (Includes sections "Press," "Broadcasting and Communications," etc.)
- "Togo", Freedom of the Press, USA: Freedom House, 2016, OCLC 57509361
