= Germany–Togo relations =

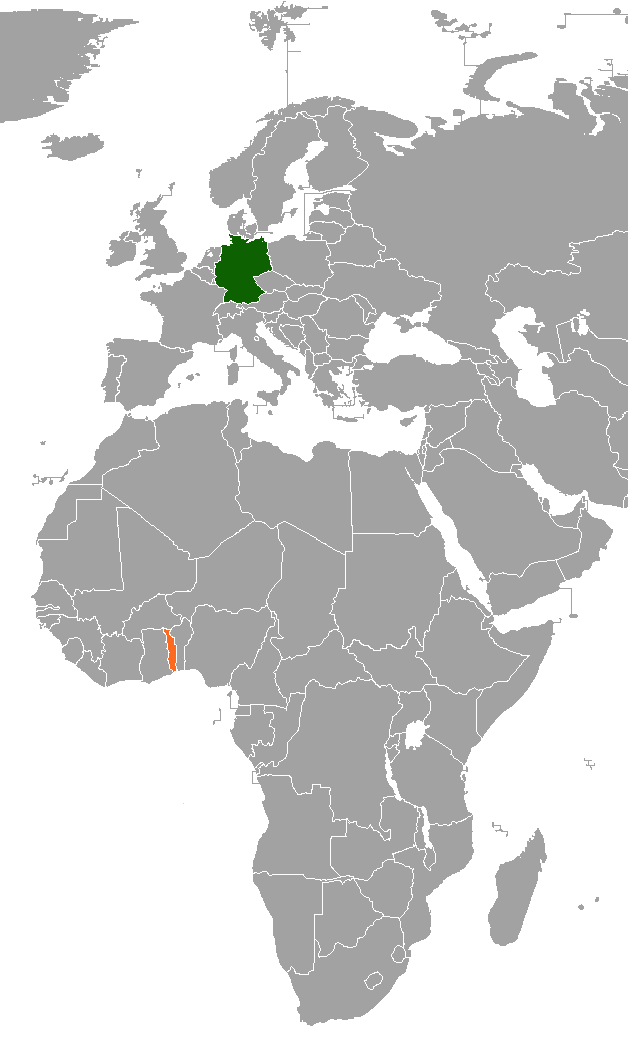

- Germany: Togo

Germany–Togo relations are shaped by the shared past of both countries. From 1884 to 1914, Togo was a colony of Germany under the name of Togoland.

== History ==
In the mid-19th century, the North German Missionary Society began missionizing the Ewe people in what is now Togo. Soon after, German trading companies established factories on the west coast of Africa. In 1882, a regular shipping connection between Togo and the German Empire was established by the Woermann-Linie. In 1884, Gustav Nachtigal hoisted the imperial German flag in Togo, and at the Congo Conference in Berlin, the area was assigned to the German sphere of influence and became a colony of the German Empire.

In the next few years, border agreements were made with France and the British Empire, and campaigns of conquest consolidated the rule in the interior. From 1891, Togo was no longer administered from Kamerun and was given its own colonial administration, which moved its administrative headquarters from Sebe to Lomé in 1897. German Togo was considered a model colony and its own protection force was not necessary, as the local ruling structures were integrated into the colonial bureaucracy with relative ease. The intensity of German colonization efforts intensified in the 19th century, when construction of railroad lines began in Togo. A plantation economy was established, and as the only colony, Togo yielded a financial profit for the empire.

After the start of World War I, Germany lost control of Togo as early as August 1914. After the end of the war, Togo was placed under League of Nations supervision in 1920 and divided between the French and British. Togo was granted autonomy by France in 1956 and half German Nicolas Grunitzky became the country's first prime minister. With Togo's independence in 1960, diplomatic relations with the Federal Republic of Germany (FRG) were established that same year. After the abandonment of the Hallstein Doctrine on the part of the FRG, Togo also established diplomatic relations with the German Democratic Republic (GDR).

In the late 1970s and 1980s, the FRG and Togo maintained good bilateral relations. The autocratically ruling Togolese President Gnassingbé Eyadéma was on friendly terms with the Bavarian Prime Minister and later German Cabinet minister Franz Josef Strauss, who regularly visited the country to go antelope hunting. Strauss described autocratically ruled Togo as a "model for Africa." After German reunification in the 1990s, relations deteriorated due to human rights violations committed in Togo. After Eyadéma's reign ended in 2005, democratic reforms were implemented in Togo and relations with Germany improved as a result. Bilateral development cooperation resumed in 2012.

== Economic relations ==
Economic relations are still poorly developed. Since the resumption of development cooperation, however, interest from German companies has increased, with a major investment by HeidelbergCement in the country. Togo is actively seeking investors from Germany. Bilateral trade volume was 79.3 million Euro in 2021.

== Development cooperation ==
Following the resumption of development cooperation in 2012, Germany has provided nearly 180 million euros in development aid until 2022. Germany is particularly involved in the areas of food security, the energy sector, and the conservation of biodiversity.

== Cultural relations ==
German in Togo continues to be a popular foreign language in the country. In 2015, almost 92,500 students in Togo learned German as a foreign language. Alongside English and French, German is offered as an elective subject in high school. The University of Lomé has a German language and literature faculty and has had a cooperation agreement with the University of Tübingen since 2012. The German Academic Exchange Service and a Goethe Institute are active in the country.

The Togo national soccer team has been coached by coaches from Germany several times with Gottlieb Göller (1970s, 1996–1997, 1999–2000), Eberhard Vogel (1997–1998) and Otto Pfister (2006).

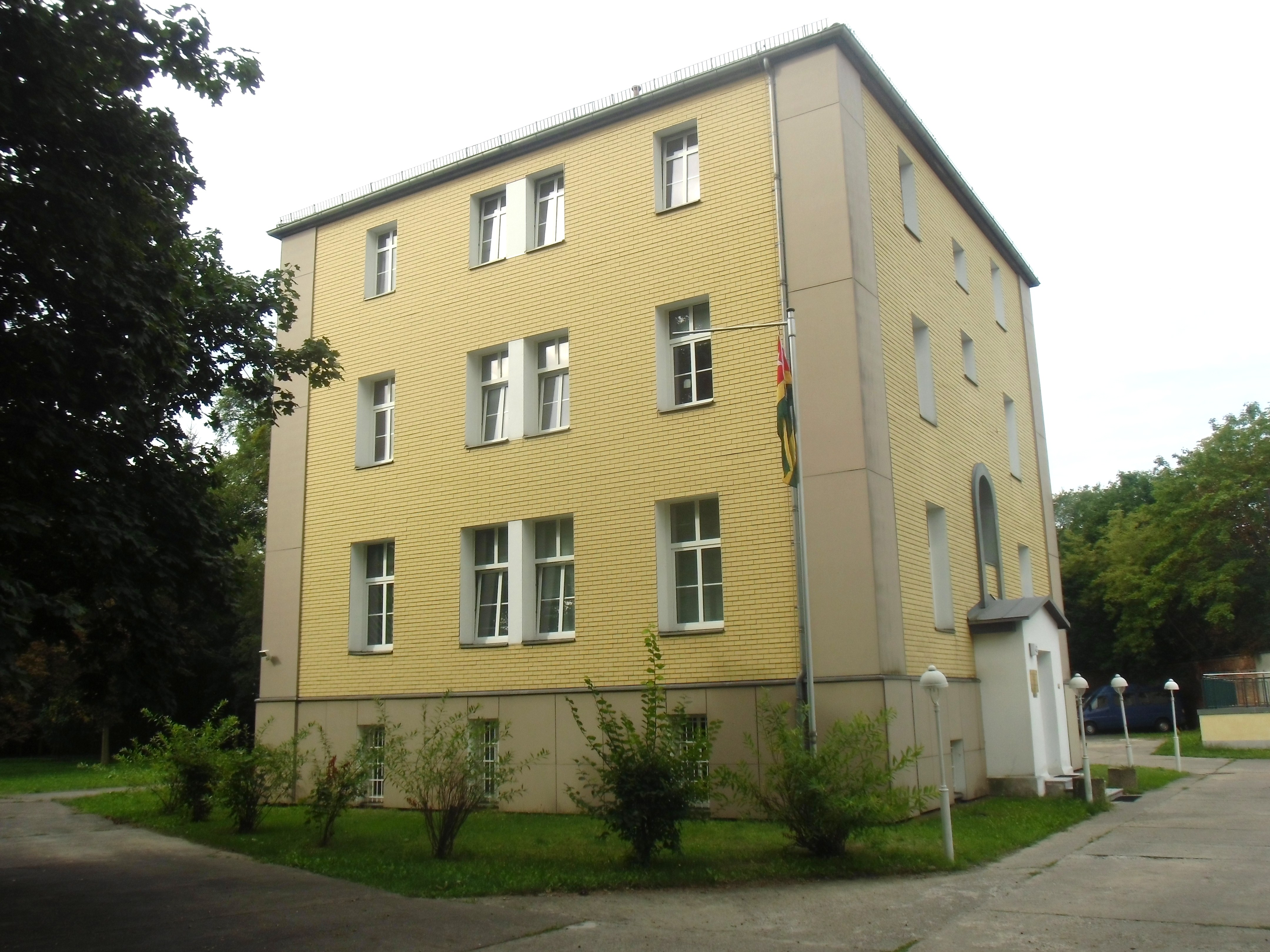
Embassy of Togo in Berlin

== Resident diplomatic missions ==
- Germany has an embassy in Lomé.
- Togo has an embassy in Berlin.
