= List of diplomatic missions in Togo =

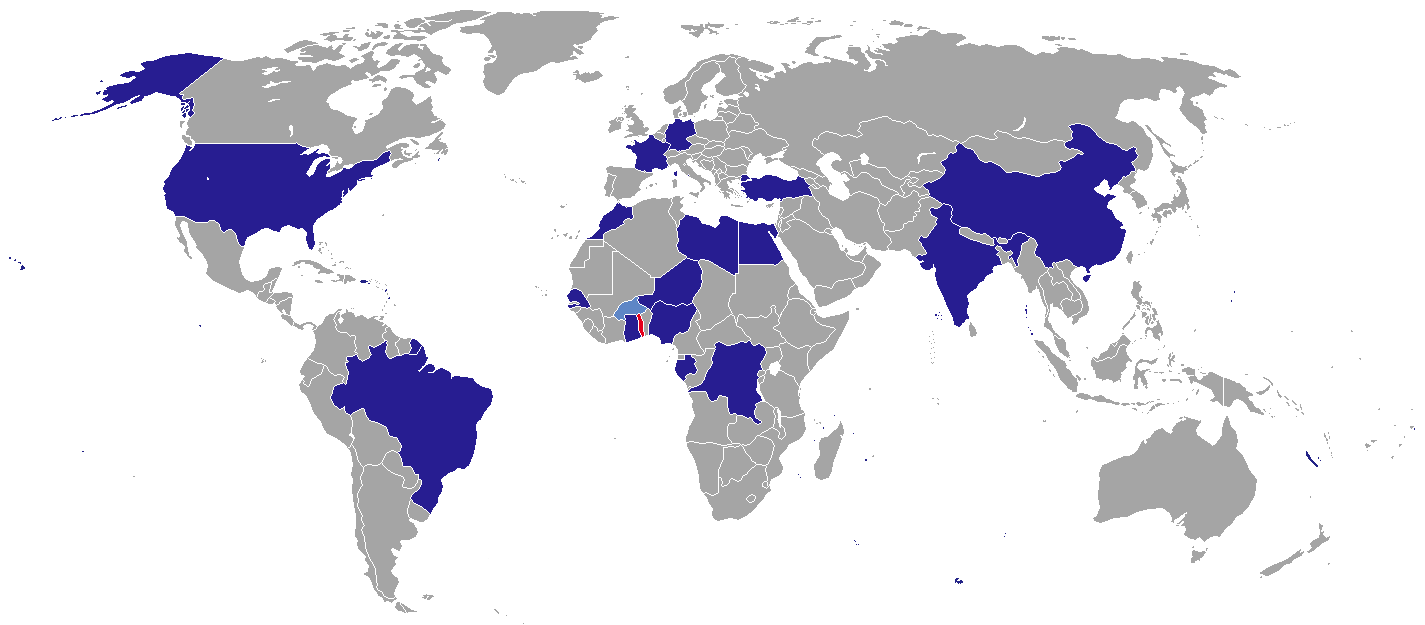
Diplomatic missions in Togo

This is a list of diplomatic missions in Togo. At present, there are 19 embassies/high commissions resident in Lomé, with several other countries accrediting ambassadors from neighboring countries.

== Embassies/High Commissions in Lomé ==
Entries marked with an asterisk (*) are member-states of the Commonwealth of Nations. As such, their embassies are formally termed as "high commissions".

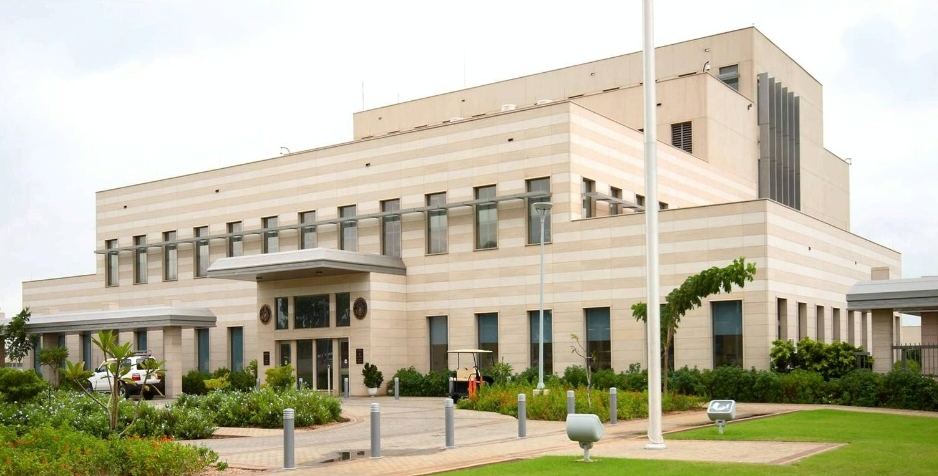
Embassy of the United States in Lomé

1. Brazil
2. China
3. Congo-Kinshasa
4. Egypt
5. France
6. Gabon*
7. Germany
8. Ghana*
9. Holy See
10. India*
11. Libya
12. Morocco
13. Niger
14. Nigeria*
15. Senegal
16. Sovereign Military Order of Malta
17. Turkey
18. United States
19. United Arab Emirates

== Other missions or delegations in Lomé ==
- Burkina Faso (Consulate-General)
- European Union (Delegation)

== Non-resident embassies ==
- Afghanistan (Paris)
- Algeria (Abuja)
- Albania (Paris)
- Andorra (Paris)
- Angola (Accra)
- Argentina (Abuja)
- Australia (Accra)
- Austria (Accra)
- Armenia (Paris)
- Antigua and Barbuda (London)
- Azerbaijan (Paris)
- Bangladesh (Abuja)
- Benin (Cotonou)
- Belgium (Cotonou)
- Bolivia (Paris)
- Bosnia and Herzegovina (Paris)
- Bulgaria (Abuja)
- Botswana (Abuja)
- Brunei (Paris)
- Burundi (Abuja)
- Central African Republic (Abuja)
- Cameroon (Abidjan)
- Canada (Accra)
- Cape Verde (Dakar)
- Colombia (Accra)
- Croatia (Paris)
- Cuba (Cotonou)
- Czechia (Accra)
- Denmark (Accra)
- Djibouti (Addis Ababa)
- Ecuador (Paris)
- El Salvador (Paris)
- Equatorial Guinea (Abuja)
- Finland (Abuja)
- Guinea (Accra)
- Guinea-Bissau (Conakry)
- Greece (Abuja)
- Haiti (Paris)
- Iran (Accra)
- Indonesia (Abuja)
- Iraq (Abuja)
- Ireland (Abuja)
- Israel (Abidjan)
- Italy (Accra)
- Ivory Coast (Accra)
- Japan (Abidjan)
- Jordan (Abuja)
- Kazakhstan (Rabat)
- Kenya (Abuja)
- Kuwait (Cotonou)
- Kyrgyzstan (Brussels)
- Laos (Paris)
- Luxembourg (Cotonou)
- Lebanon (Accra)
- Maldives (London)
- Mali (Accra)
- Malaysia (Accra)
- Morocco (Cotonou)
- Mexico (Abuja)
- Netherlands (Accra)
- Nicaragua (Ouagadougou)
- Norway (Abuja)
- New Zealand (Cairo)
- Oman (Abuja)
- Pakistan (Accra)
- Philippines (Abuja)
- Palestine (Abuja)
- Poland (Abuja)
- Portugal (Abidjan)
- Republic of China (Taiwan) (Paris)
- Romania (Abuja)
- Russia (Cotonou)
- Rwanda (Accra)
- Saudi Arabia (Accra)
- Sahrawi Republic (Accra)
- Serbia (Abuja)
- Seychelles (Addis Ababa)
- Sierra Leone (Accra)
- Slovakia (Abuja)
- South Africa (Coutonou)
- Spain (Accra)
- Sweden (Abuja)
- Switzerland (Accra)
- South Korea (Accra)
- Thailand (Abuja)
- Tanzania (Abuja)
- Turkmenistan (Paris)
- Tunisia (Abidjan)
- United Arab Emirates (Accra)
- United Kingdom (Accra)
- Uzbekistan (Paris)
- Venezuela (Cotonou)
- Vietnam (Abuja)
- Yemen (Paris)
- Zambia (Accra)
- Zimbabwe (Abuja)

== Closed missions ==
Host city	Sending country	Mission	Year closed	Ref.
Lomé	Czechoslovakia	Embassy	1963	
Lomé	Russia	Embassy	1992	

== See also ==
- Foreign relations of Togo
- List of diplomatic missions of Togo
