= India–Togo relations =

- India: Togo

India and Togo maintain diplomatic relations. Togo opened its embassy, now high commission, in New Delhi in October 2010. The High Commission of India in Accra, Ghana is concurrently accredited to Togo. India also maintains an Honorary Consulate General in Lomé.

Both India and Togo are Commonwealth countries.

== Historical relations ==
Togolese President Gnassingbe Eyadema made a brief stopover in Calcutta, on his way to China, in 1989. He made an official state visit to India in September 1994. During the visit, the two countries agreed to establish Joint Commission. Prime Minister Gilbert Houngbo led the Togolese delegations to the 6th CII-Exim Bank Conclave in India in March 2010, to the 12th Regional Conclave on India-Africa Project Partnership in Accra on 3 June 2010, and to the 7th CII-Exim Bank Conclave in India in March 2011. Togo was a partner country at the India-Africa Conclave in New Delhi in March 2011. Houngbo stated during his visit that Togo wanted to learn from India's Green Revolution and its poverty alleviation schemes. Several Togolese ministers, members of Parliament, and senior presidential advisors have also visited India.

From India, the highest level visits to Togo have been at the level of minister of state. Lok Sabha Speaker Balram Jakhar visited Lome in 1985 to attend an Inter-Parliamentary Conference.

== Cultural relations ==
Indian citizen Chander Verma, Togo's former honorary consul in India, was awarded the Officer de Order de Mono, Togo's highest civilian honor given to individuals who show extraordinary merit, by President Faure Essozimna Gnassingbe in June 2011.

Students and professionals from Togo have attended capacity building courses at the Indian Institute of Foreign Trade and other Indian institutions. Togolese scientists visited India between June and December 2013 and participated in research studies under the CV Raman Research Fellowships Scheme.

In December 2016, about 200-300 Indians resided in Togo, the majority of whom are involved in trade, assembly plants, and running supermarkets and hotels. Although there was an Indian community association in Togo, it was not very active due to the small size of the community.

As of 2025, Togo and India have been working to strengthen their relationship. Cultural figures and artists from both nations will visit the other nation to develop more cultural diversity.

== Economic relations ==
=== Bilateral trade ===
India is Togo's third largest destination for exports. In particular, India is a major importer of phosphates from Togo. Bilateral trade between India and Togo grew from US$505 million in 2011–12 to $884 million in 2014–15. Trade declined slightly to $757.28 million in 2015–16. India exported $532.19 million worth of goods to Togo, and imported $225.09 million in 2015–16. In 2024, bilateral trade between Togo and India reached over $3.5 billion, with India maintaining a significant trade surplus. Togolese exports to India totaled $789 million (making India Togo's top export destination) led primarily by calcium phosphates ($284 million), cashews and soybeans. Conversely, Indian exports to Togo totaled $2.76 billion, driven largely by refined petroleum ($2.06 billion), rice, and light vehicles. By mid-2026, monthly bilateral trade flows continued to fluctuate, with raw agricultural products and minerals constituting Togo's primary exports, while manufactured goods, refined fuels, and industrial machinery dominated imports from India.

The main commodities exported by India to Togo are mineral fuels, mineral oils and products of their distillation, cereals and preparation of cereals cotton, articles of apparel and clothing, iron and steel articles, man-made filaments, man-made staple fibers, drugs and pharmaceuticals, machinery and mechanical appliances, plastic and plastic articles, rubber and rubber articles, vehicles, and vehicle parts and accessories. The major commodities imported by India from Togo are natural phosphates, ferrous and copper waste and scrap, wood and wood articles, other metal scrap, oilseeds, coconuts and Brazil nuts.

The Synthetic & Rayon Textiles Export Promotion Council of India organized an Indian Textile Exhibition in Togo in March 2013. The Indian Institute of Foreign Trade, New Delhi organized an Executive Development Programme in Lome in August 2013. Around 20 Togolese businessmen attended the 12th India-Africa Summit in New Delhi in March 2017.

In March 2025, India's Fertilisers And Chemicals Travancore entered talks for a three-year contract to import 250,000 metric tons of rock phosphate annually from Togo's Societe Nouvelle des Phosphates du Togo. This would be the first long-term fertilizer deal between an Indian company and Togo. India, seeking to secure soil nutrient supplies for its agriculture sector, imported 1.1 million tons of rock phosphate from Togo in the 2023–24 fiscal year, a 30% increase from the previous year.

=== Foreign aid ===
India has provided assistance to Togo by providing the country with tractors, water pumps, sewing machines, ambulances, transport vehicles and corn-grinding machines. India provided Togo with a grant of ₹10 crore (equivalent to ₹72 crore or US$7.7 million in 2026) in September 1994 to establish an agricultural project. At the request of the Togolese Government, India supplied the country with indelible ink for use in elections in 2002. India donated medicines to provide relief to victims of flooding in Togo in 2008. India implemented the Pan African e-network project. in Togo, which had signed the country agreement with TCIL in 2008 to implement the project. At the India-Africa Forum Summit, India offered to establish a Human Settlement Centre, an India-Africa Centre for English Language Training, and an Agricultural Seed Production-cum-Demonstration in Togo.

The Government of Togo signed a line of credit (LOC) agreement worth $15 million with the Exim Bank of India in November 2011 for use in a rural electrification project. In January 2012, India extended an LOC of $13.095 million to fund farming of rice, maize and sorghum. By December 2014, India extended four LOCs totaling $144.35 million to Togo for various projects, including procurement of health equipment ($20.04 million), upgrade of power generation and distribution capacity of CCET ($13 million), and construction of transmission lines in Kara-Mango-Dapong.

The Secretary of the Indian Council for Agricultural Research (ICAR) led an Indian delegation to Togo in December 2013. ICAR discussed establishing an Agricultural Seed Production-cum-Demonstration Centre in the country. Two Indian experts visited Togo in May 2014 to provide technical assistance for development of the domestic cotton industry. India provided $100,000 to enable Togo to organize the AU Maritime Security Summit in Lome in October 2016.

Citizens of Togo are eligible for scholarships under the Indian Technical and Economic Cooperation Programme and the Indian Council for Cultural Relations.

== Political relations ==
Sunil James, the Indian captain of a Marshall Islands-flagged merchant ship MT Ocean Centurion made a stop at Togo on 31 July 2013 to report that his ship had come under attack from pirates on 16 July. However, Togolese authorities arrested James and two crew members, accusing them of allegedly aiding the pirates. James and another Indian sailor named Vijayan were released on 19 December 2013, following a meeting between the Indian High Commissioner in Accra and President Gnassingbe. India had requested James' release on "compassionate grounds" as his 11-month-old son had died on 2 December 2013, and his family was awaiting his return to perform the last rites.

Five Indian employees of a merchant navy firm – Anthony Godwin, Shaji Abdulla Kutty, Tharun Babu, Nithin Babu and Navin Niravath Gopi – were arrested and jailed in Togo in July 2013. They were accused of being involved in a pirate attack off the coast of Togo. All five men were from the state of Kerala, and were arrested on board a ship sailing from Mumbai to South Africa. After the involvement of Foreign Minister Sushma Swaraj, all five men were released by Togolese authorities on 1 February 2017.
