= List of diplomatic missions of Togo =

This is a list of diplomatic missions of Togo (excluding honorary consulates). Togo has a modest number of diplomatic missions abroad.

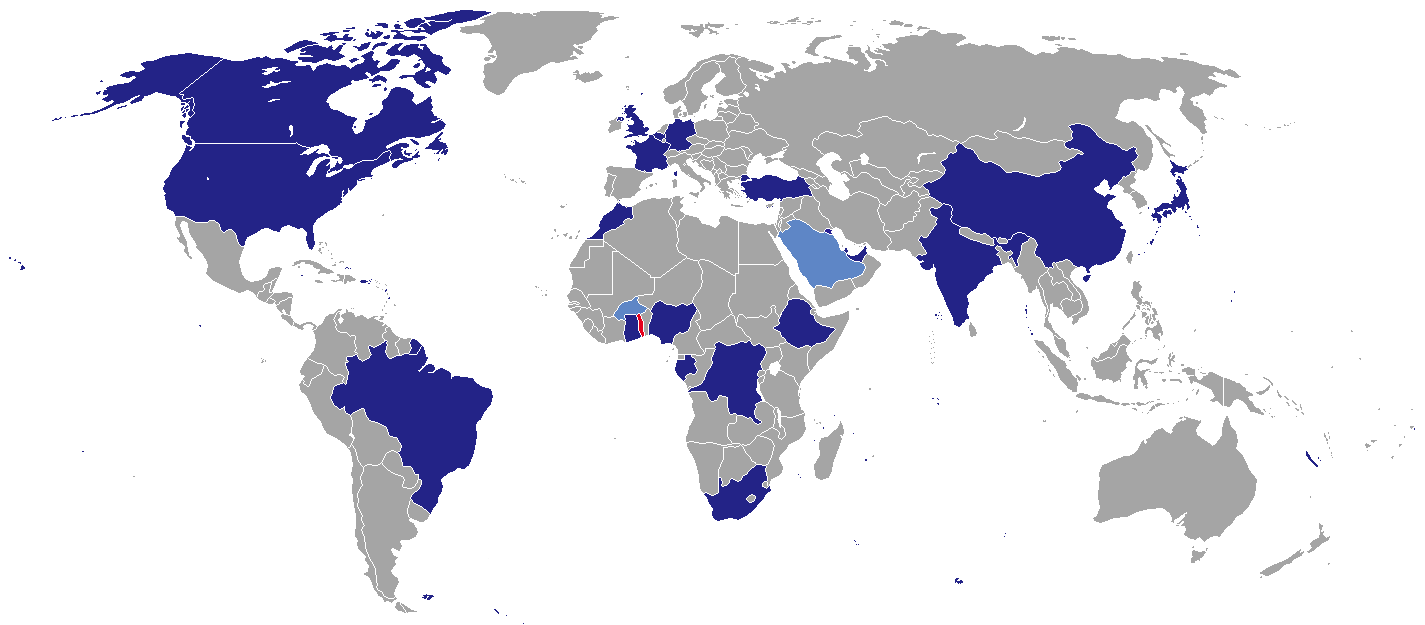
Map of Togolese diplomatic missions

== Current missions ==
=== Africa ===
Host country	Host city	Mission	Concurrent accreditation	Ref.
Burkina Faso	Ouagadougou	Consulate-General		
Congo-Kinshasa	Kinshasa	Embassy	Countries: Angola; Burundi; Central African Republic; Congo-Brazzaville; Rwanda; Tanzania; Zambia	
Ethiopia	Addis Ababa	Embassy	Countries: Djibouti; Kenya; International Organizations: African Union; United Nations Economic Commission for Africa	
Gabon	Libreville	High Commission	Countries: Cameroon; Equatorial Guinea; São Tomé and Príncipe	
Ghana	Accra	High Commission		
Morocco	Rabat	Embassy		
Morocco	Dakhla	Consulate-General		
Nigeria	Abuja	High Commission	Countries: Benin; Chad; Niger; International Organizations: Economic Community of West African States	
South Africa	Pretoria	High Commission	Countries: Botswana; Comoros; Eswatini; Madagascar; Malawi; Mauritius; Mozambique; Lesotho; Namibia; Seychelles; Zimbabwe	

=== Americas ===
Host country	Host city	Mission	Concurrent accreditation	Ref.
Brazil	Brasília	Embassy	Countries: Argentina; Bolivia; Chile; Colombia; Ecuador; Paraguay; Peru; Suriname; Uruguay; Venezuela	
Canada	Ottawa	High Commission		
United States	Washington, D.C.	Embassy	Countries: Bahamas; Costa Rica; Cuba; Dominican Republic; El Salvador; Guatemala; Haiti; Honduras; Jamaica; Mexico; Nicaragua; Panama; International Organizations: International Monetary Fund; World Bank	

=== Asia ===
Host country	Host city	Mission	Concurrent accreditation	Ref.
China	Beijing	Embassy		
India	New Delhi	High Commission	Countries: Bangladesh; Indonesia; Pakistan; Sri Lanka	
Japan	Tokyo	Embassy	Countries: Singapore; South Korea	
Kuwait	Kuwait City	Embassy		
Qatar	Doha	Embassy		
Saudi Arabia	Jeddah	Consulate-General	International Organizations: Organisation of Islamic Cooperation	
Turkey	Ankara	Embassy		
United Arab Emirates	Abu Dhabi	Embassy	Countries: Israel; Oman; Yemen	

=== Europe ===
Host country	Host city	Mission	Concurrent accreditation	Ref.
Belgium	Brussels	Embassy	Countries: Holy See; Luxembourg; Netherlands; International Organization: European Union; International Court of Justice; Organisation of African, Caribbean and Pacific States; Organisation for the Prohibition of Chemical Weapons; World Customs Organization	
France	Paris	Embassy	Countries: Cyprus; Malta; Monaco; Spain	
Germany	Berlin	Embassy	Countries: Austria; Czech Republic; Denmark; Estonia; Finland; Hungary; Latvia; Lithuania; Moldova; Montenegro; Poland; Slovakia; Slovenia; Ukraine; International Organization: Comprehensive Nuclear-Test-Ban Treaty; International Anti-Corruption Academy; International Atomic Energy Agency; United Nations Industrial Development Organization; United Nations Office on Drugs and Crime; United Nations Office at Vienna	
United Kingdom	London	High Commission	Countries: Ireland; International Organization: Commonwealth of Nations	

=== Multilateral organizations ===
Organization	Host city	Host country	Mission	Concurrent accreditation	Ref.
United Nations	New York City	United States	Permanent Mission		
United Nations	Geneva	Switzerland	Permanent Mission	Countries: Switzerland	
UNESCO	Paris	France	Permanent Delegation	International Organization: Organisation internationale de la Francophonie	

== Gallery ==
Embassy in Beijing

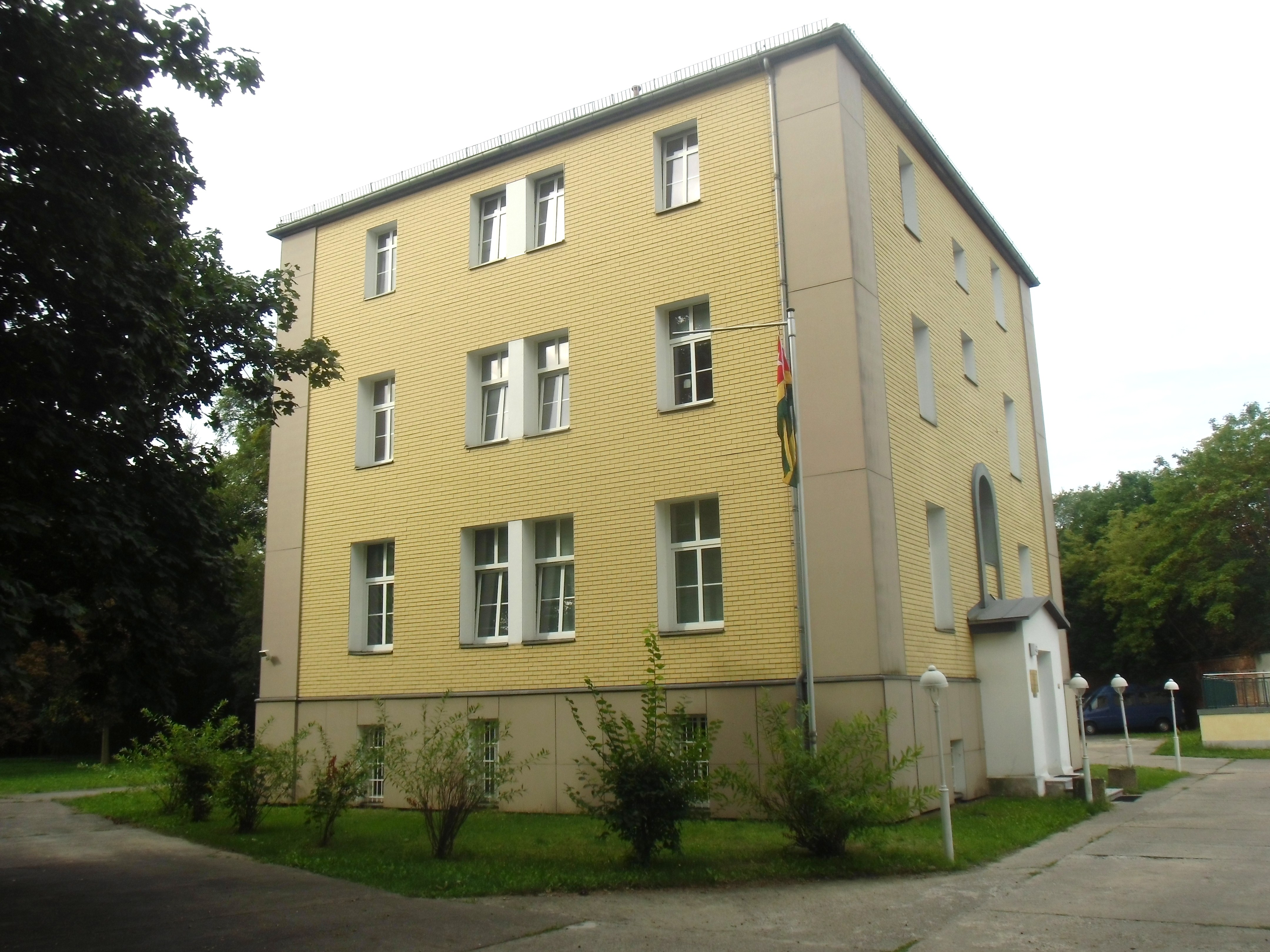
Embassy in Berlin

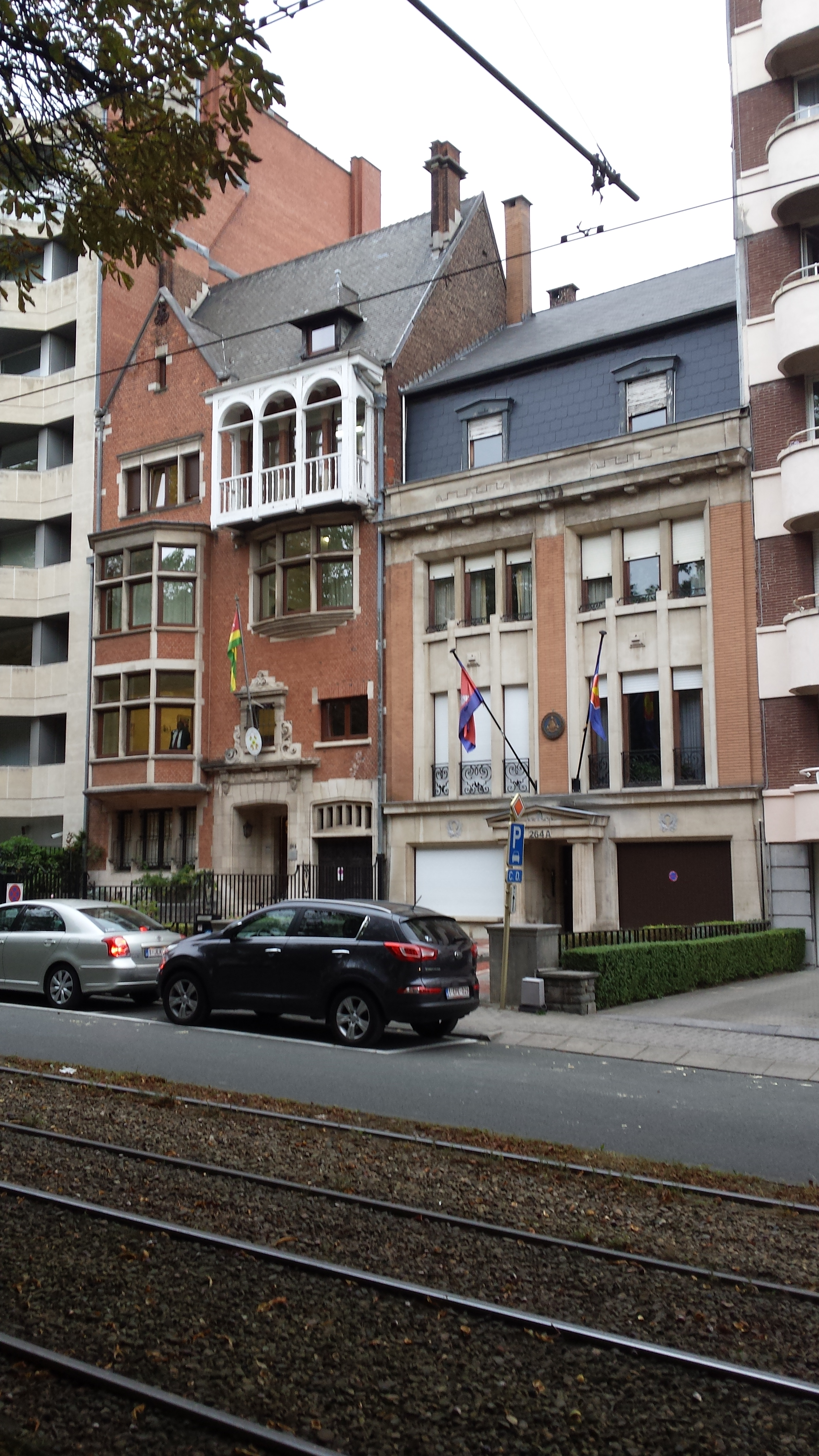
Embassy in Brussels

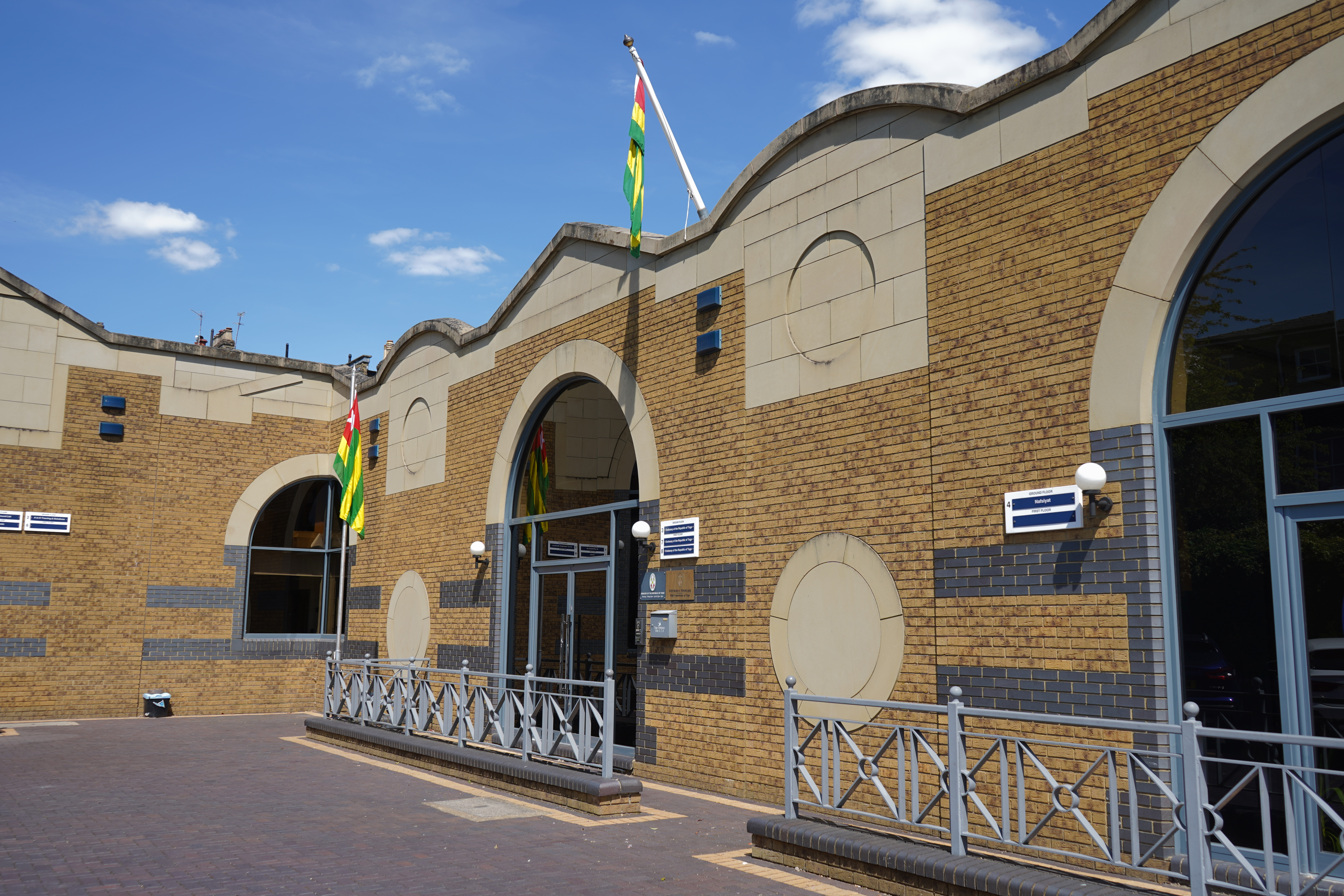
High Commission in London

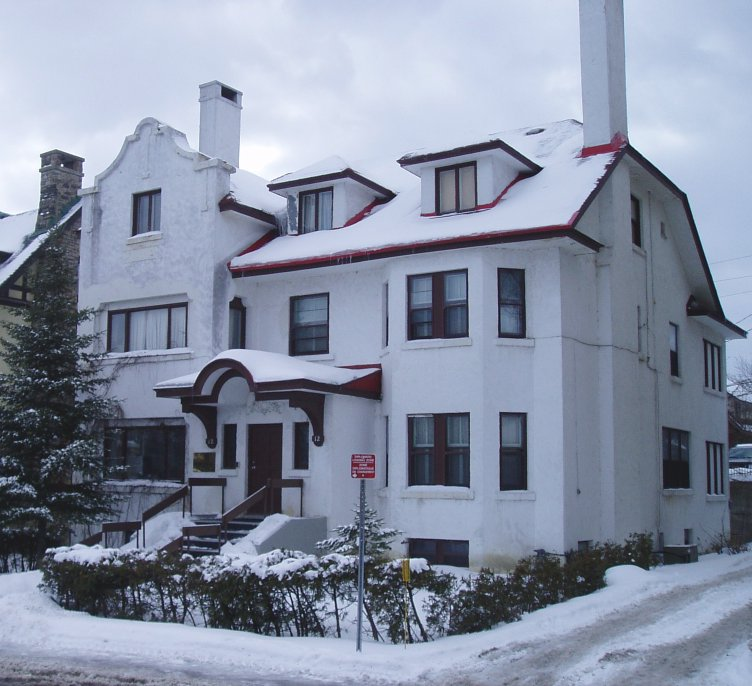
High Commission in Ottawa

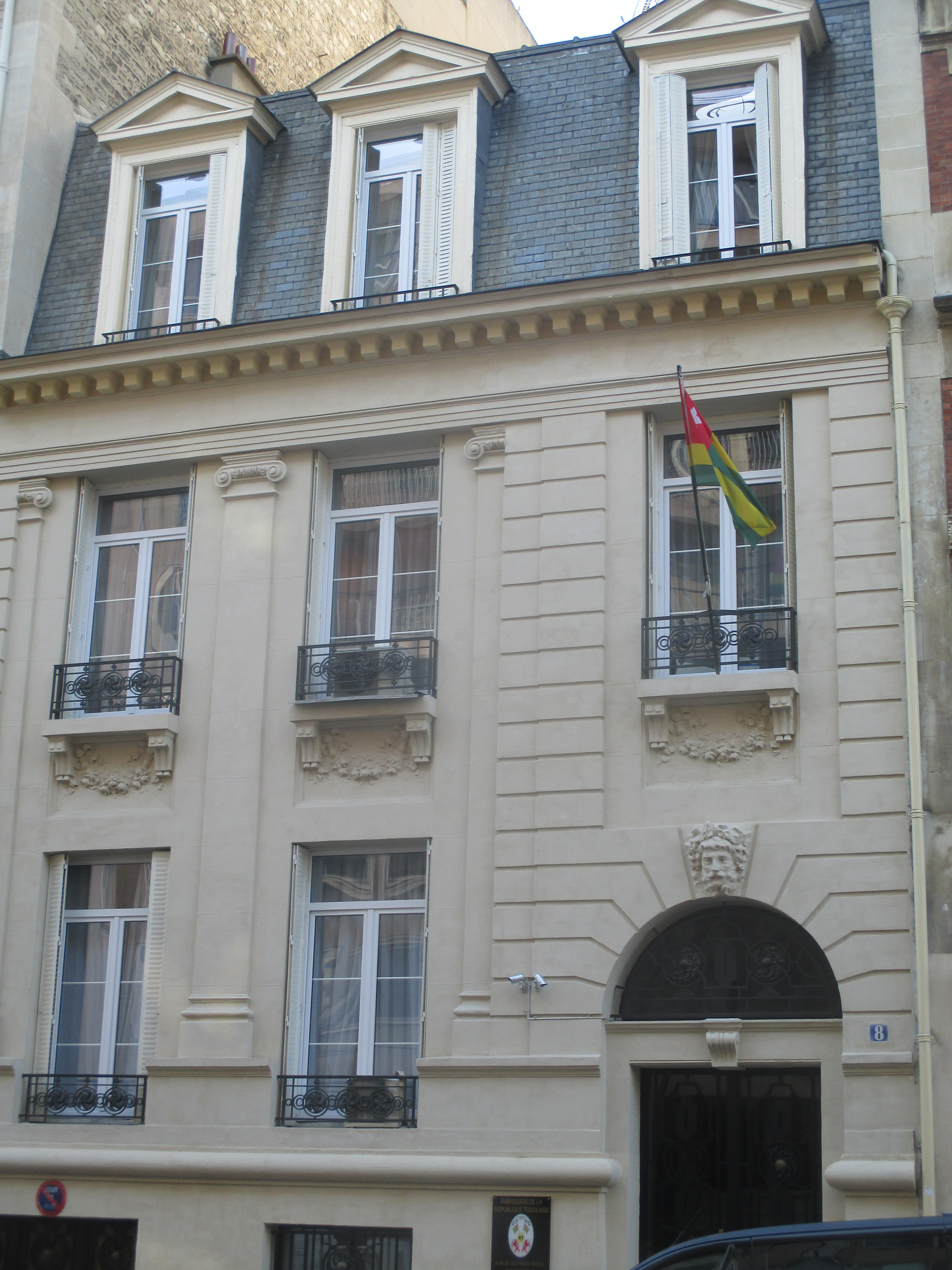
Embassy in Paris

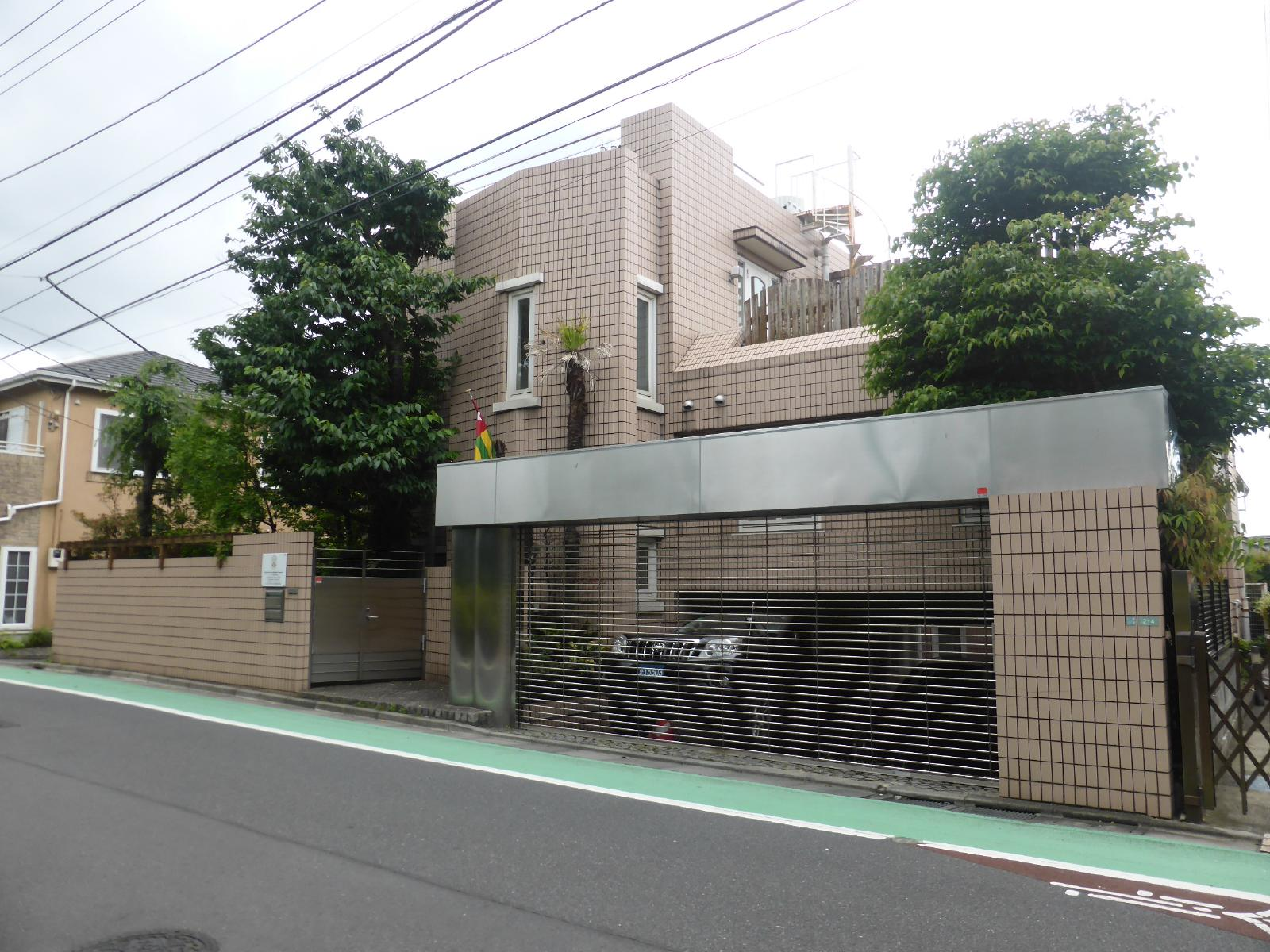
Embassy in Tokyo

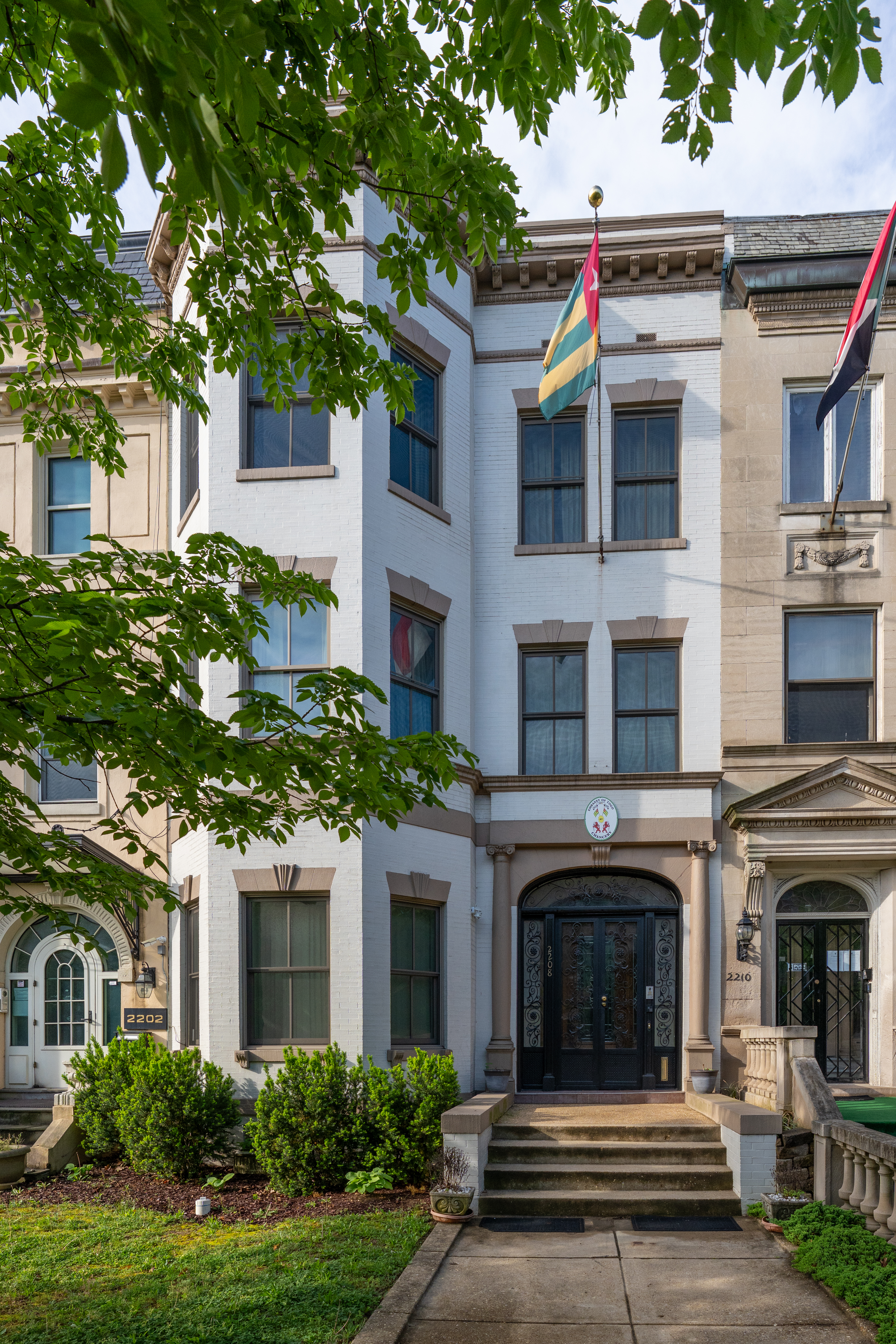
Embassy in Washington, D.C.

== Embassy to open ==
Host country	Host city	Mission	Ref.
Russia	Moscow	Embassy	

== Closed missions ==
Host country	Host city	Mission	Year closed	Ref.
Libya	Tripoli	Embassy	2015	

== See also ==
- Foreign relations of Togo
- List of diplomatic missions in Togo
- Visa policy of Togo
