= Togolese Television =

Togolese national television broadcaster

Télévision Togolaise
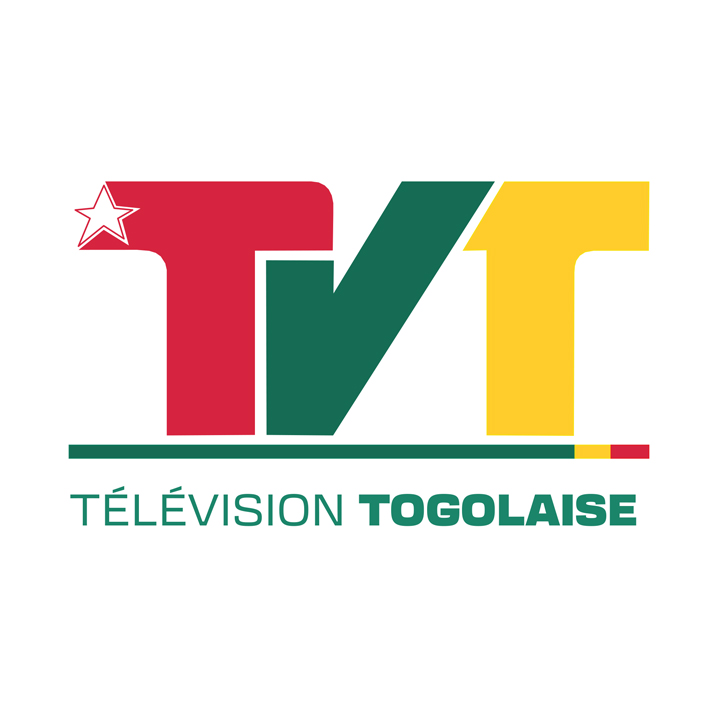
- Type: Broadcast
- Country: Togo
- Availability: National
- Founded: 31 July 1973
- Headquarters: Lomé, Togo
- Owner: Government of Togo
- Official website: http://tvt.tg

Télévision Togolaise is the national broadcaster of the West African state of Togo. Télévision Togolaise is headquartered in the capital city, Lomé.

It was founded on 31 July 1973.

== History ==
It was in 1969 that the Togolese government officially took the decision to provide the country with a national television channel in order to promote information, education and entertainment for the population. However, it was not until 31 July 1973, that President Gnassingbé Eyadéma inaugurated the Togolese television studios - officially called Radio-Television de la Nouvelle Marche (RTNM) - and the first broadcasts of this new medium were broadcast. While initially only the Lomé region was covered, the creation of new transmitters in the interior of the country (starting in 1975) in Agou, Dapaong and more recently in Badou and Atakpamé has made it possible to considerably extend the national television broadcasting area.

In 1979, Togolese television began its first color broadcasts in the SECAM format. In 1990, it took the name of Télévision Togolaise (TVT), still in use today.

== See also ==
- Media of Togo
