= Mining industry of Togo =

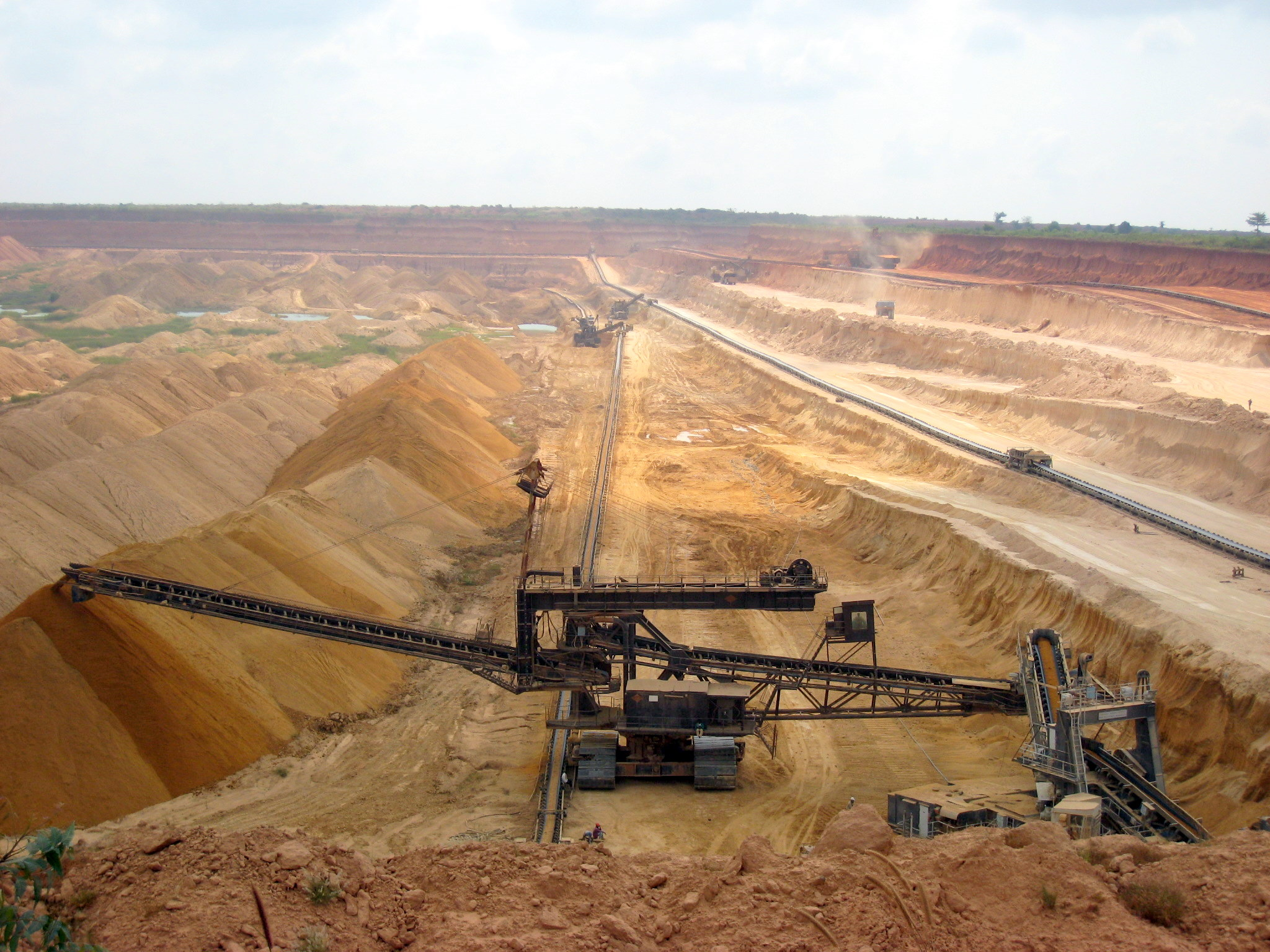
Phosphate mining in Togo

The mining industry of Togo is centred mainly around the extraction of phosphate, ranking it 19th in world production. Other minerals extracted are diamond, gold, and limestone. More minerals identified but yet to be brought into production mode are manganese, bauxite, gypsum, iron ore, marble, rutile, and zinc. The mineral sector contributes 2.8% to the country's gross domestic product (GDP).

== Production and impacts ==
Phosphate output was 1.2 million tons in 2013. In 2011, its export accounted for 7.5% of the country's exports. Clinker, limestone, and hydraulic cement have marked increased production in recent years. However, diamond production under the Kimberley Process Certification Scheme has shown a decline.

One of the major companies operating in Togo is Keras Resources PLC, which plans to mine some 14 million tons at the Nayega manganese mine in northern Togo. The West African Cement Company, formerly Cement West Africa, is responsible for mining limestone in the Tabligbo basin near the coast. In 2002, 1,352,000 tons of limestone mined in Togo were used to manufacture 950,000 tons of clinker. The clinker plant commissioned in 2015 has a capacity for the production of 5,000 tons of clinker per day, amounting to 1.5 million tons per year. Togo has several areas with deposits of diamonds and gold. The Birrimian area in the north is one of the main gold yielding areas.

== Legal framework ==
Mining in the country is the responsibility of the Ministry of Mines and Energy. The Directorate General of Mines and Geology is the specific institution geared towards mineral exploration, analysis, and control of mining, which is in turn divided into three branches: the Research Directorate of Geology and Mining, The Directorate of Development and Mining Control, and the Laboratories Directorate of Mining and Oil.

Legislation in practice in the mineral sector is law no. 96–004/pr of February 26, 1996, and as amended by Act no. 2003–012. The Extractive Industries Transparency Initiative (EITI) was in the process of further validation with the International Secretariat. As of April 2012, the mining code was also under the final stage of approval of the government.
