= List of banks in Togo =

This is a list of commercial banks in Togo, as updated in September 2024 by the Banking Commission of the West African Monetary Union.

== List of commercial banks ==
- Bank of Africa Togo (BOA-Togo), part of Bank of Africa Group
- Banque Atlantique Togo, part of BCP Group
- Banque Internationale pour l'Afrique au Togo (BIA-Togo), part of Attijariwafa Bank Group
- Banque Sahélo-Saharienne pour l'Investissement et le Commerce - Togo, part of BSIC Group
- Coris Bank International Togo, part of Coris Bank Group
- Ecobank Togo, part of Ecobank Group
- International Business Bank Togo (IB Bank Togo), part of IB Bank Group
- Orabank Togo, part of Orabank Group
- Société Interafricaine de Banque (SIAB)
- SUNU Bank Togo, part of SUNU Group
- Union Togolaise de Banque (UTB)
- Branch of Banque de Développement du Mali
- Branch of NSIA Banque Benin, part of NSIA Group
- Branch of Société Générale Benin (state-owned)

== See also ==
- Economy of Togo
- List of companies based in Togo
- List of banks in Africa
