= Air Togo =

Flag carrier of Togo (1998–2000)

IATA	ICAO	Call sign
YT	TGA	AIR TOHO
- Founded: 1998
- Ceased operations: 2000
- Operating bases: Lomé-Tokoin Airport
- Headquarters: Togo

Air Togo (Compagnie Aerienne Togolaise) (IATA: YT, ICAO: TGA, call sign: AIR TOHO) was was a flag carrier of Togo, operating from 1998 to 2000, It operates flights between Togo and France, as well as to neighbouring countries in West Africa, out of its base at Lomé-Tokoin Airport.

== Services ==
Air Togo international destinations from Lomé have included Accra, Bamako, Cotonou, Ouagadougou and Paris.

Domestic services have included Sokodé, Mango, Dapaong, Kara, Niamtougou and Lomé.

== Fleet ==
The Air Togo fleet included one Airbus A300B4 (F-GVVV), and one Airbus A310-300 (F-GEMO).
