= Africa West Airlines =

Cargo airline based in Togo

Africa West
IATA	ICAO	Call sign
FK	WTA	WEST TOGO
- Founded: 1997
- Ceased operations: 2013
- Headquarters: Lomé, Togo

Africa West was a cargo airline based in Lomé, Togo. The company was founded in 1997, ceased operations on December 30, 2013, and mainly operated in West Africa and Central Africa.

== History ==
Africa West was an integrated transportation company, operated exclusively for freight forwarders, specialized on the transportation of outsize shipments. The cargo airline used a fleet of 1 Boeing 757 (leased to Icelandair), 1 DC-9, an AN-12 and covered over 21 destinations.

== Network ==
Regional Hub

- Lomé (LFW)
- Brazzaville (BZV)
- Douala (DLA)
- Monrovia (MLW)
- Malabo (SSG)
- Cotonou (COO)
- Bangui (BGF)
- Ouagadougou (OUA)
- Pointe Noire (PNR)
- Bamako (BKO)
- Freetown (FNA)
- Niamey (NIM)
- Conakry (CKY)
- Libreville (LBV)
