= Economy of Togo =

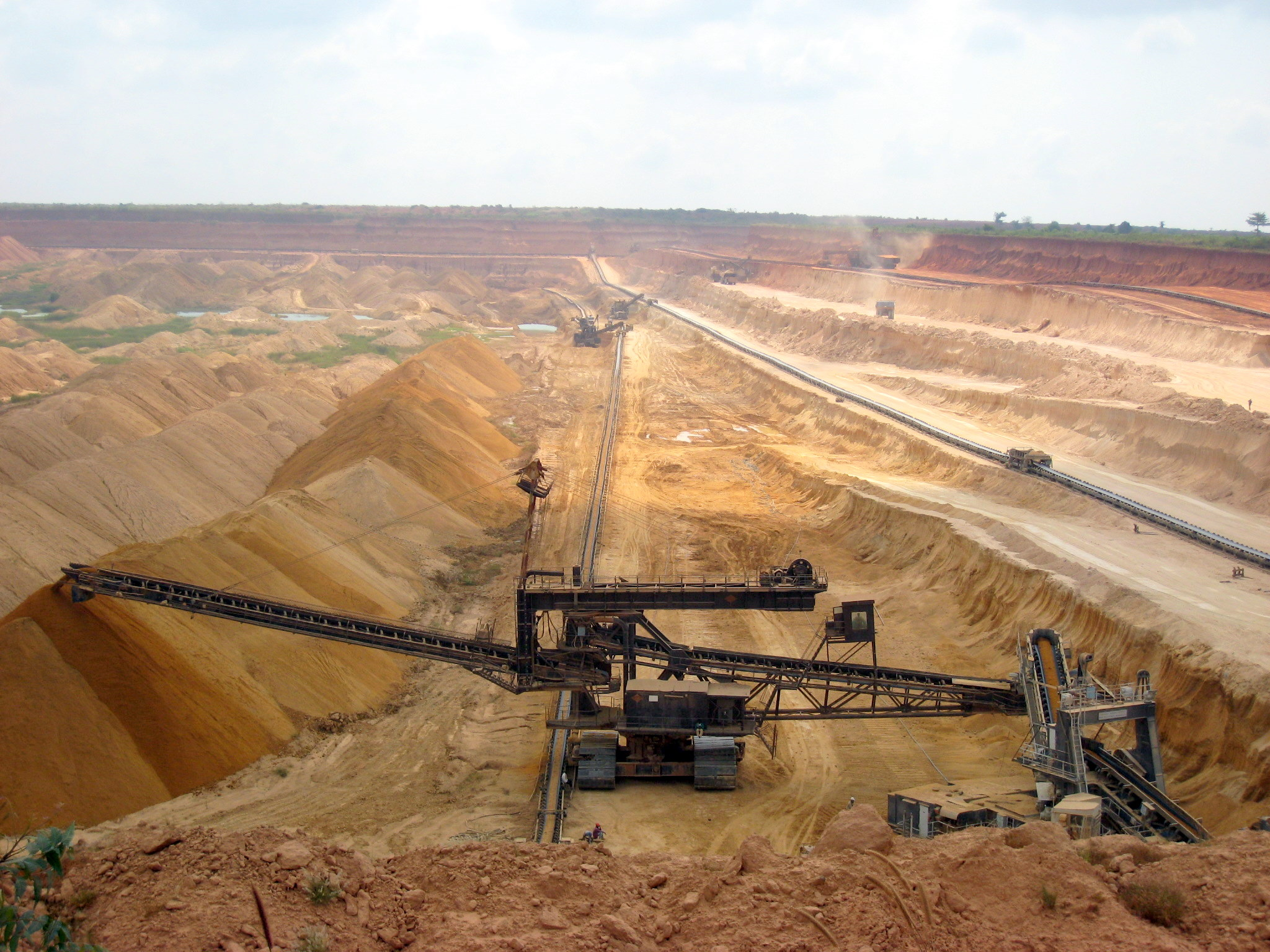
- Phosphate mining in Togo
- Currency: West African CFA Franc (XOF)
- Trade organisations: AU, AfCFTA, CEN-SAD, ECOWAS, WTO
- Country group: Least Developed; Lower-middle income economy

Statistics
- Population: ▲8,608,444 (2020) (Note: This estimate explicitly take into account the effects of excess mortality due to AIDS in Togo; this can result in lower life expectancy, higher infant mortality, higher death rates, lower population growth rates, and changes in the distribution of population by age and sex than would otherwise be expected.)
- GDP: ▲$13.437 billion (nominal, 2026 est.); ▲$37.956 billion (PPP, 2026 est.)
- GDP rank: 147th (nominal, 2026); 144th (PPP, 2026)
- GDP growth: 5.3% (2025f)
- GDP per capita: ▲$1,480 (nominal, 2026 est.); ▲$4,275 (PPP, 2026 est.)
- GDP per capita rank: 165th (nominal, 2026); 165th (PPP, 2026)
- GDP by sector: agriculture: 28.1%; industry: 21.6%; services: 50.3%; (2017)
- Inflation (CPI): 2.0% (2020 est.)
- Population below national poverty line: ▲55.1% (2015); 49.2% on less than $1.90/day (2015)
- Gini coefficient: 43.1 medium (2015)
- Human Development Index: ▲0.571 medium (2023) (161st); 0.350 IHDI (2018)
- Labour force: 3,807,000 (2020)
- Labour force by occupation: agriculture 69%; industry 6%; services 25%; (2008)
- Unemployment: 3.95% (2020)
- Main industries: phosphate mining, agricultural processing, cement, handicrafts, textiles, beverages

External
- Exports: ▲$1.002 billion (2017)
- Export goods: re exports, cotton, phosphates, coffee, cocoa
- Main export partners: Benin 17.5%; Burkina Faso 15.9%; India 7.6%; Mali 7.2%; Niger 7%; Côte d’Ivoire 6.1%; Ghana 4.8%; Nigeria 4.3%; (2015)
- Imports: ▲$2.009 billion (2017)
- Import goods: machinery and equipment, foodstuffs, petroleum products
- Main import partners: China 22.9%; Belgium 20.3%; Netherlands 11.9%; France 6.6%; India 4.8%; Singapore 4.4%; (2015)
- FDI stock: $451 million (2017)
- Gross external debt: ▼$1.387 billion (2017)

Public finance
- Government debt: ▼$391 million (2017)
- Foreign reserves: $215.1 million (2017)
- Revenue: ▲$1.469 billion (2017)
- Spending: ▲$1.7 billion (2017)
- All values, unless otherwise stated, are in US dollars.

Togo has developing economy considered low-income. The International Monetary Fund (IMF) ranks it as the 10th-poorest country in the world, with development undercut by political instability, low commodity prices, and external debts. While industry and services play a role, the economy is dependent on subsistence agriculture, with industrialization and regional banking suffering major setbacks.

In January 2017, the IMF signed an Extended Credit Facility arrangement, consisting of a three-year $238 million loan package. Progress depends on follow through on privatization, increased transparency in government financial operations, progress toward legislative elections, and continued support from foreign donors.

== Agriculture ==
Despite the majority of the Togolese population depending on subsistence agriculture, it still contributes significantly to their GDP. Its agricultural products includes coffee, cocoa, cotton, yams, cassava (tapioca), corn, beans, rice, pearl millet, sorghum and livestock such as fish. Food and cash crop production employs the majority of the labor force and contributes about 42% to the gross domestic product (GDP). Coffee and cocoa are traditionally the major cash crops for export, but cotton cultivation increased rapidly in the 1990s, with 173,000 metric tons produced in 1999.

After a disastrous harvest in 2001 (113,000 metric tons), cash crops production rebounded to 168,000 metric tons in 2002. Despite insufficient rainfall in some areas, the Togolese government has achieved its goal of self-sufficiency in food crops — maize, cassava, yams, sorghum, pearl millet, and groundnut. Small and medium-sized farms produce most of the food crop; the average farm size is one to three hectares.

Togo produced in 2018:

- 1 million tons of cassava;
- 886 thousand tons of maize;
- 858 thousand tons of yam;
- 277 thousand tons of sorghum;
- 207 thousand tons of beans;
- 156 thousand tons of palm oil;
- 143 thousand tons of vegetable;
- 145 thousand tons of rice;
- 127 thousand tons of cotton;
- 43 thousand tons of peanut;
- 41 thousand tons of cocoa;
- 26 thousand tons of millet;
- 26 thousand tons of banana;
- 21 thousand tons of coffee;

In addition to smaller productions of other agricultural products.

Choco Togo is the country's first bean-to-bar chocolate manufacturer.

== Industry ==
=== Mining ===
In the industrial sector, phosphates are Togo's most important commodity, and the country has an estimated 60 million metric tons of phosphate reserves. From a high point of 2.7 million tons in 1997, production dropped to approximately 1.1 million tons in 2002. The fall in production is partly the result of the depletion of easily accessible deposits and the lack of funds for new investment. The formerly state-run company Société Nouvelle des Phosphates du Togo (New Phosphate Company of Togo) appears to have benefited from private management, which took over in 2001. Togo also has substantial limestone and marble deposits.

Encouraged by the commodity boom of the mid-1970s, which resulted in a fourfold increase in phosphate prices and sharply increased government revenues, Togo embarked on an overly ambitious program of large investments in infrastructure while pursuing industrialization and development of state enterprises in manufacturing, textiles, and beverages. However, following declines in world prices for commodities, its economy became burdened with fiscal imbalances, heavy borrowing, and unprofitable state enterprises.

=== Other ===
While Togo itself produces no crude oil, it is the namesake of an illegal market for stolen oil off the Niger Delta, called the Togo Triangle.

== IMF relationship ==
Togo turned to the IMF for assistance in 1979, while simultaneously implementing a stringent adjustment effort with the help of a series of IMF standby programs, World Bank loans, and Paris Club debt rescheduling. Under these programs, the Togolese Government introduced a series of austerity measures and major restructuring goals for the state enterprise and rural development sectors. These reforms were aimed at eliminating most state monopolies, simplifying taxes and customs duties, curtailing public employment, and privatizing major state enterprises. Togo made good progress under the international financial institutions' programs in the late 1980s, but movement on reforms ended with the onset of political instability in 1990. With a new, elected government in place, Togo negotiated new 3-year programs with the World Bank and IMF in 1994.

Togo returned to the Paris Club in 1995 and received Naples terms, the club's most concessionary rates. With the economic downturn associated with Togo's political problems, scheduled external debt service obligations for 1994 were greater than 100% of projected government revenues (excluding bilateral and multilateral assistance). By 2001, Togo was embarked on an IMF Staff Monitored Program designed to restore macroeconomic stability and financial discipline but without any new IMF resources pending new legislative elections. New IMF, World Bank and Africa Development Bank (ADB) lending must await the willingness of Togo's traditional donors – the European Union, principally, but the US also – to resume aid flows. So far, Togo's problematic legislative and presidential elections and the government's continued unwillingness to transition from an Eyadéma-led autocracy to democracy have deterred these donors from providing Togo with more aid. As of the fall 2002, Togo was $15 million in arrears to the World Bank and owed $3 million to the ADB.

Togo is one of 16 members of the Economic Community of West African States (ECOWAS). The ECOWAS development fund is based in Lomé. Togo also is a member of the West African Economic and Monetary Union (UEMOA), which groups seven West African countries using the CFA franc. The West African Development Bank (BOAD), which is associated with UEMOA, is based in Lomé. Togo long served as a regional banking center, but that position has been eroded by the political instability and economic downturn of the early 1990s. Historically, France has been Togo's principal trading partner, although other European Union countries are important to Togo's economy. Total United States trade with Togo amounts to about $16 million annually.

== Trade ==
Exports of Togo by product category (2019) Chemical products Transportation Machines Mineral products Plastics and rubbers Metals Foodstuffs Precious metals Textiles Instruments Animal products Vegetable products Paper goods Footwear and headwear Miscellaneous Stone and glass Wood products Animal and vegetable bi-products Animal hides Arts and antiques Weapons

Trade is extremely important to Togo's economy; the combined value of exports and imports equals 105% of GDP. The average applied tariff rate is 11.4 percent. Non-tariff barriers impede some trade. Government openness to foreign investment is above average. Capital transactions are subject to some controls or government approval. The evolving banking system continues to expand but lacks liquidity.

Despite Togo’s relatively open trade environment, several regulations are in place to ensure transparency and cargo security. One key measure is the Cargo Tracking Note (CTN), also known as the Electronic cargo tracking note (ECTN), which is required for all maritime shipments destined for or transiting through Togo. Exporters must register shipment information before the cargo arrives at Togolese ports, allowing authorities to monitor goods, verify cargo value, and improve customs oversight. Failure to obtain a valid CTN can result in fines, shipment delays, or refusal of customs clearance.

Togo opened a national trade information portal in March 2025, publishing the tariffs, procedures and documents that apply to foreign trade; the first phase covered thirteen priority products. Exporters claiming preferential treatment obtain certificates of origin from the Office Togolais des Recettes.

== Statistics ==
The following table shows the main economic indicators in 1980–2024.

Year	GDP (in bil. US$ PPP)	GDP per capita (in US$ PPP)	GDP (in bil. US$ nominal)	GDP growth (real)	Inflation (in Percent)	Government debt (Percentage of GDP)
1980	2.6	934	2.0	▼−2.3%	▲12.3%	n/a
1981	▲2.8	▲955	▼1.7	▼−3.4%	▲19.7%	n/a
1982	2.8	▼942	▼1.4	▼−3.7%	▲11.1%	n/a
1983	2.8	▼898	▼1.3	▼−5.2%	▲9.4%	n/a
1984	▲3.1	▲953	▼1.2	▲5.9%	▲ −3.5%	n/a
1985	▲3.3	▲988	▲1.3	▲3.7%	▲ −1.8%	n/a
1986	▲3.5	▲1,009	▲1.8	▲3.3%	▲4.1%	n/a
1987	3.5	▼978	▲2.1	▼ −2.5%	▲0.1%	n/a
1988	▲4.0	▲1,082	▲2.3	▲10.1%	▲ -0.2%	n/a
1989	▲4.3	▲1,137	2.3	▲4.1%	▲ -1.0%	n/a
1990	▲4.7	▲1,213	▲2.8	▲5.9%	▲1.1%	n/a
1991	▲4.8	▼1,210	▼2.7	▼−0.6%	▲0.2%	n/a
1992	4.8	▼1,164	▲2.9	▼−3.2%	▲1.6%	n/a
1993	▼4.1	▼1,004	▼2.2	▼−16.3%	▲ -0.1%	n/a
1994	▲4.8	▲1,165	▼1.7	▲13.9%	▲35.3%	n/a
1995	▲5.8	▲1,361	▲2.2	▲19.7%	▲15.8%	n/a
1996	▼5.7	▼1,282	▲2.4	▼−3.9%	▲4.6%	n/a
1997	▲6.0	▲1,311	▲2.5	▲3.8%	▲5.3%	n/a
1998	6.0	▼1,258	▼2.4	▼−2.3%	▲1.0%	n/a
1999	▲6.2	▲1,271	2.4	▲2.5%	▲ −0.1%	n/a
2000	▲6.3	▼1,251	▼2.0	▼−1.0%	▲1.6%	n/a
2001	▲6.5	▲1,256	2.0	▲0.8%	▲5.1%	n/a
2002	▲6.8	▲1,290	▲2.3	▲3.8%	▲2.7%	n/a
2003	▲7.4	▲1,368	▲2.9	▲6.7%	▲ −0.9%	n/a
2004	▲7.5	▼1,354	▲3.0	▼−1.0%	▲0.7%	n/a
2005	▼7.4	▼1,298	▲3.1	▼−4.7%	▲5.3%	▲63.1%
2006	▲7.8	▲1,335	▲3.2	▲2.7%	▲1.1%	▲67.7%
2007	▲8.2	▲1,349	▲3.8	▲1.2%	▲0.4%	▲70.5%
2008	▲8.6	▲1,390	▲4.6	▲4.0%	▲7.7%	▼67.3%
2009	▲9.2	▲1,434	▲4.7	▲5.5%	▲4.1%	▼57.6%
2010	▲9.8	▲1,496	▲4.8	▲5.9%	▲0.2%	▼33.5%
2011	▲10.6	▲1,573	▲5.4	▲5.8%	▲3.6%	▲33.8%
2012	▲11.5	▲1,660	5.4	▲6.3%	▲2.6%	▲34.3%
2013	▲12.4	▲1,741	▲6.0	▲5.8%	▲1.8%	▲41.1%
2014	▲13.3	▲1,825	▲6.4	▲5.6%	▲0.2%	▲44.9%
2015	▲14.2	▲1,894	▼5.8	▲5.5%	▲1.8%	▲52.4%
2016	▲15.1	▲1,972	▲6.1	▲5.7%	▲0.9%	▲59.9%
2017	▲16.0	▲2,037	▲6.4	▲4.0%	▲ −0.2%	▼57.1%
2018	▲17.1	▲2,122	▲7.0	▲4.8%	▲0.9%	▲58.0%
2019	▲18.7	▲2,274	7.0	▲4.9%	▲0.7%	▼54.9%
2020	▲20.4	▲2,417	▲7.4	▲2.0%	▲1.8%	▲62.2%
2021	▲22.9	▲2,644	▲8.3	▲6.0%	▲4.5%	▲64.9%
2022	▲25.9	▲2,926	▼8.1	▲5.8%	▲7.6%	▲67.4%
2023	▲28.3	▲3,125	▲9.1	▲5.6%	▲5.3%	▲68.0%
2024	▲30.6	▲3,290	▲9.8	▲5.3%	▲2.7%	▲69.7%

== See also ==
- Economy of Africa
- Economy of Ghana
- List of Ghanaian companies
- List of banks in Togo
- List of companies based in Togo
- Togo
- United Nations Economic Commission for Africa
