= Air Horizon =

Airline in Togo (2004–2007)

IATA	ICAO	Call sign
8C	HZT	HORIZON TOGO
- Founded: 2004
- Ceased operations: 2007
- Hubs: Lomé-Tokoin Airport
- Fleet size: 3
- Headquarters: Lomé, Togo

Air Horizon, formerly known as Transtel Togo, was an airline based in Lomé, Togo operating flights within Africa, the Middle East and Asia out of Lomé-Tokoin Airport. The airline was founded in 2004 and shut down in 2007.

== Fleet ==
As of March 2007, the Air Horizon fleet included the following aircraft:

- Two Vickers Viscount V.810
- One Boeing 727

== Accidents and incidents ==
- On 24 July 2001, Vickers Viscount 3D-OHM of Transtel was damaged beyond economic repair in a take-off accident at N'Djamena International Airport when the aircraft departed the runway, damaging the engines and propellers. Although written off by the insurers, the aircraft was repaired. Repairs were almost complete when a soldier accidentally discharged his gun, puncturing a fuel tank.
