= List of Togolese artists =

The following list of Togolese artists (in alphabetical order by last name) includes artists of various genres, who are notable and are either born in Togo, of Togolese descent or who produce works that are primarily about Togo.

== A ==
- Kossi Aguessy (1977–2017), Togolese-born Brazilian industrial designer, sculptor
- Didier Ahadsi (born 1970), Togolese-born Ewe self-taught sculptor
- Paul Ahyi (1930–2010), sculptor, designer, architect, painter, interior designer, author; credited with designing of the national flag
- Joseph Amedokpo (born 1946), painter

== B ==
- Talle Bamazi, Togolese-born Kabye painter, curator, and gallery owner; lives in Ohio, U.S.

== F ==
- Sika Foyer (born 1968), Togolese-born American mixed media artist, conceptual artist, and curator; lives in New York City

== K ==
- Emmanuel Kavi (born 1970), abstract painter
- Agbagli Kossi (1935–1991), sculptor of Vodun art

== See also ==
- List of Togolese people
- Togolese culture
- Vodun art
