= List of Togolese people =

This article contains a list of notable Togolese people, in order by profession, followed by alphabetical order by last name. To be included in this list, the person must have a Wikipedia article.

== Actors, musicians, and entertainers ==
- Barthélémy Attisso (1945–2021), lawyer and guitarist for Orchestra Baobab
- Camih Gantin, model, crowned Miss Togo 2012
- Jimi Hope (1956–2019), also known as Koffi Senaya, musician, painter and sculptor
- Stéphane Legar (born 1998), Israeli-born singer, dancer, and model of Togolese heritage
- King Mensah (born 1971), singer
- Togbe Agbodjan Jad Fozis (born 1971), reggae musician, guitarist and singer-songwriter

== Businesspeople ==
- Eunice Adabunu (born 1919), businesswoman
- Dédé Rose Creppy (1934–2023), businesswoman

== Politicians, activists, and political leaders ==
- Bonfoh Abass (1948–2021), politician, who was the interim President of Togo
- Mazamesso Assih (born 1979), politician
- Emmanuel Bodjollé (born 1928), former military officer, acting president of Togo
- Kléber Dadjo (1914–c.1988), military officer, acting president of Togo
- Gnassingbé Eyadéma (1935–2005), military officer, third president of Togo
- Faure Gnassingbé (born 1966), politician, former president of Togo, who has served as first president of the Council of Ministers of Togo
- Nicolas Grunitzky (1913–1969), former president of Togo
- Sandra Ablamba Johnson (born 1980), economist and political figure
- Sylvanus Olympio (1902–1963), politician, who served as prime minister, and then president of Togo
- Jean-Lucien Savi de Tové (born 1939), former president of Togo

== Sports people, and athletes ==
- Jean-Paul Abalo (born 1975), footballer
- Emmanuel Adebayor (born 1984), footballer who formerly played for Arsenal, Manchester City and Real Madrid
- Sabirou Bassa-Djeri (1987–2025), footballer who plays for Nigerian club Enyimba
- Ariel Hukporti (born 2002), German-born professional basketball of Togolese heritage
- Samson Johnson (born 2002), college basketball player for the UConn Huskies
- Komi Moreira (born 1968) former olympic cyclist
- Mawupemon Otogbe (born 2003), former olympic swimmer
- Jimmy Williams (born 1986), American-born Togolese professional basketball player

== Others ==
- Véronique Massan Osséyi (c. 1940–2010), also known as Véronique Dagadzi, magistrate, politician, and jurist; wife of president Gnassingbé Eyadéma

== See also ==
- Outline of Togo
