= List of presidents of the National Assembly of Togo =

List of presidents of the National Assembly of Togo.

Below is a list of office-holders:

Name	Entered office	Left office
Jonathan Sanvi De Tové	1960	1963
Barthélémy Lamboni	1964	1967
Georges Apedo Amah	1981	1985
Mawupé Valentin Vovor	1985	1988
Messan Acouetey	1988	July 1991
Philippe Fanoko Kpodzro	20 August 1991	February 1994
Dahuku Pere	February 1994	March 1999
Agbéyomé Kodjo	22 June 1999	29 August 2000
Fambaré Ouattara Natchaba	3 September 2000	5 February 2005
Faure Gnassingbé	5 February 2005	24 February 2005
Abass Bonfoh	24 February 2005	25 July 2013
Dama Dramani	26 July 2013	20 December 2018
Yawa Djigbodi Tségan	24 January 2019	14 June 2024
Kodjo Adedze	14 June 2024	incumbent
