= Adétikopé Solar Power Station =

Solar farm in Togo

- Country: Togo
- Location: Adétikopé, Zio Prefecture, Maritime Region
- Coordinates: 06°19′23″N 01°11′43″E
- Status: Proposed
- Owner: Arise Integrated Industrial Platforms (Arise IIP)

Solar farm
- Type: Flat-panel PV

Power generation
- Nameplate capacity: 390 MW (520,000 hp)

The Adétikopé Solar Power Station is a planned 390 MW (520,000 hp) solar power plant in Togo, with 200 MWh (720 GJ), attached battery energy storage. The power station is in the development stage, under concessional terms by the company Arise Integrated Industrial Platforms (Arise IIP), a subsidiary of the Africa Finance Corporation (AFC), in partnership with the Government of Togo. As of July 2021 a qualified EPC company was being sought to construct the power station, either on its own or in partnership with the existing stakeholders. When completed, this power station will be the largest grid-ready solar power plant in West Africa. The energy is primarily intended to power an industrial park, Adétikopé Industrial Platform (PIA), a 400 hectares (1.5 sq mi) business and industrial development, immediately north of Lomé, the national capital.

== Location ==
The power station would be located in the Adétikopé Industrial Platform, in Zio Prefecture, in the Maritime Region of Togo. This is approximately 22 kilometres (14 mi), north of the city center of Lomé, Togo's capital city.

== Overview ==
Arise IIP, working with the Togolese government is in the process of establishing an industrial park at Adétikopé. To supply power to the businesses and industries in the new industrial park, Adétikopé Solar Power Station is being developed. In addition to the 390 megawatt solar farm, a battery storage system with capacity of 200MWh and a 161 kVA substation will be constructed.

== Tendering for EPC partner ==
The developer/owners of this power station have given prospective EPC bidders two choices. The first option is to design, build, operate for 5 years and then transfer the power plant to Arise IIP. Under this option, Arise IIP will finance the development. The second option is for the EPC company to form a joint venture with Arise IIP and sign a 20-year power purchase agreement with the Togolese electricity utility company. Under this option Arise IIP and the EPC company will raise the funding jointly.

== See also ==
- List of power stations in Togo
