= Amegnran =

Amégnran Amégnran Kondji
- town
- Location in Togo Amégnran (Africa)
- Coordinates: 6°28′N 1°34′E
- Country: Togo
- Region: Maritime Region
- Prefecture: Vo
- Time zone: UTC + 0

Amegnran is a town in the Vo Prefecture in the Maritime Region of southern Togo.
