= Vogan, Togo =

Vogan
- Interactive map of Vogan
- Location in Togo
- Coordinates: 6°20′N 1°32′E
- Country: Togo
- Region: Maritime Region

Population (2005)
  - Total: 1,019

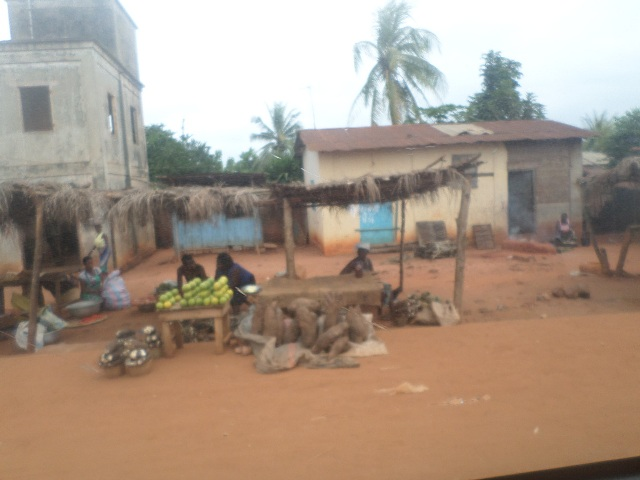
VOGAN MARKET

Vogan is a town and canton located in the Maritime Region of Togo. It lies approximately 45–60 km (30–35 mi) northeast of Lomé, the capital of Togo, and is the capital of Vo prefecture. It is known for its Friday market, which is one of the largest voodoo markets in West Africa. Vogan is primarily inhabited by Ewe people. Vogan has one of the biggest and most colourful markets in Togo. On Friday, people from Aneho, Lomé, and even Ghana come to buy or sell goods in the Vogan market. Currently, Vogan is ruled by the King senou Odzima KALIPE IV.

== Notable people ==
- Didier Ahadsi (born 1970), self-taught sculptor
- Joseph Amedokpo (born 1946), painter
