= Attitogon =

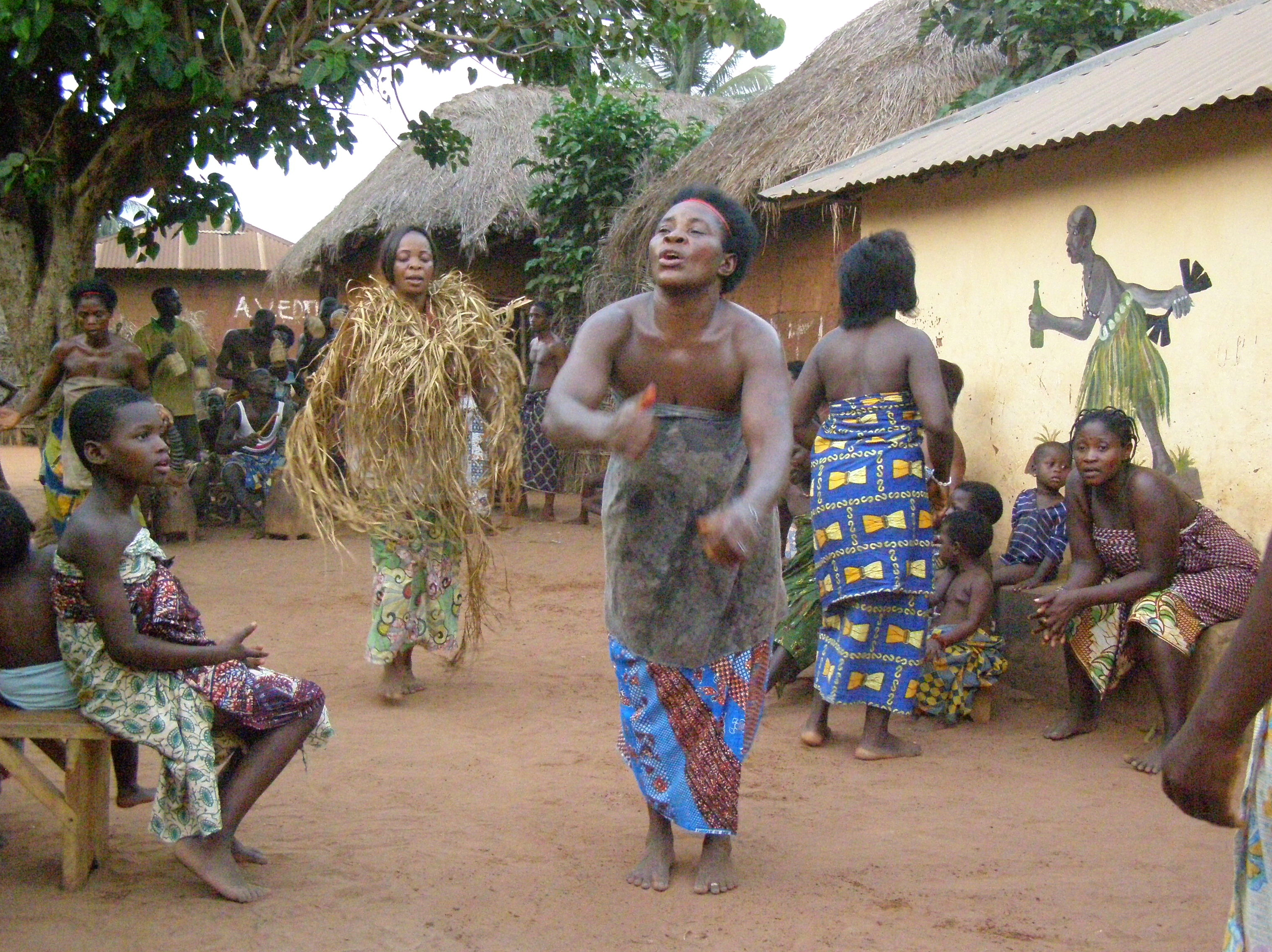

- Location in Togo
- Coordinates: 6°25′N 1°40′E
- Country: Togo
- Region: Maritime Region
- Time zone: UTC + 0

Attitogon or Atitogan is a canton and village in the Lacs Prefecture in the Maritime Region of south-eastern Togo.

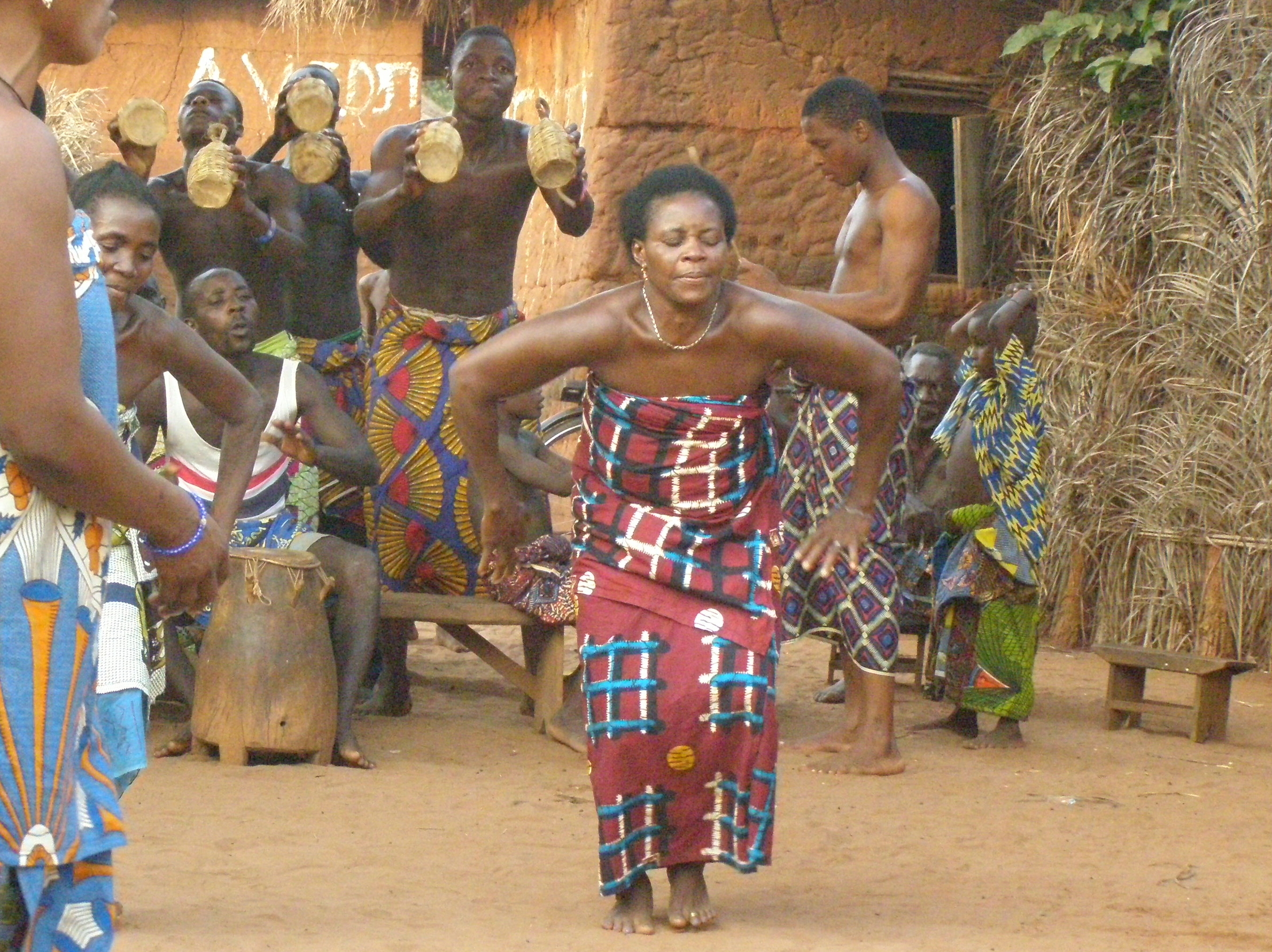
Voodoo being practised in Attitogon
