= Yawa Djigbodi Tségan =

Togolese politician

President of the National Assembly of Togo
- In office 24 January 2019 – 14 June 2024
- President: Faure Gnassingbé
- Prime Minister: Victoire Tomegah Dogbé
- Preceded by: Dama Dramani
- Succeeded by: Kodjo Adedze

Personal details
- Born: August 5, 1971 (age 54)

Chantal Yawa Djigbodi Tségan (born 1971) is a Togolese politician who was President of the country's unicameral National Assembly between January 2019 and June 2024.

== Early life and education ==
Chantal Yawa Djigbodi Tségan was born on 5 August 1971 in Kpélé-Agavé in Kloto. She has a Master's in Business Law from the University of Benin in Togo and a Diploma of Tax Inspection from the National School of Taxes of Clermont-Ferrand in France.

== Career ==
Tségan was a tax inspector, working for the Large Enterprises Department. She also worked at the Directorate General of Taxes and in October 2010 became chief of staff for the Ministry of Transport.

Tségan was elected to the National Assembly to represent Kloto-Kpelé in July 2013 and again in December 2018, when she became first quaestor of the Assembly. She is a member of President Faure Gnassingbe's party, Union for the Republic (UNIR) and has been treasurer since October 2017.

Tségan was elected President of the Assembly on 23 January 2019 with 88 of 89 votes, and is the first woman to hold the position. However, her elevation to the position has been criticised by members of the opposition as part of Gnassingbe's attempts to paint a picture of democracy despite ongoing "repression and suffering".

In December 2020, Tségan led the Organisation internationale de la Francophonie observation mission reporting on the general election in Niger, declaring that the elections took place "under peaceful and transparent conditions."

== Personal life ==
Tségan is married and has three children.
