= Creppy =

Creppy is a surname, and may refer to:

- Dédé Rose Creppy
- Jermyn Creppy (born 1996), Danish rapper and songwriter

== See also ==
- Creepy
