= Pacôme Yawovi Adjourouvi =

Franco-Togolese lawyer & politician

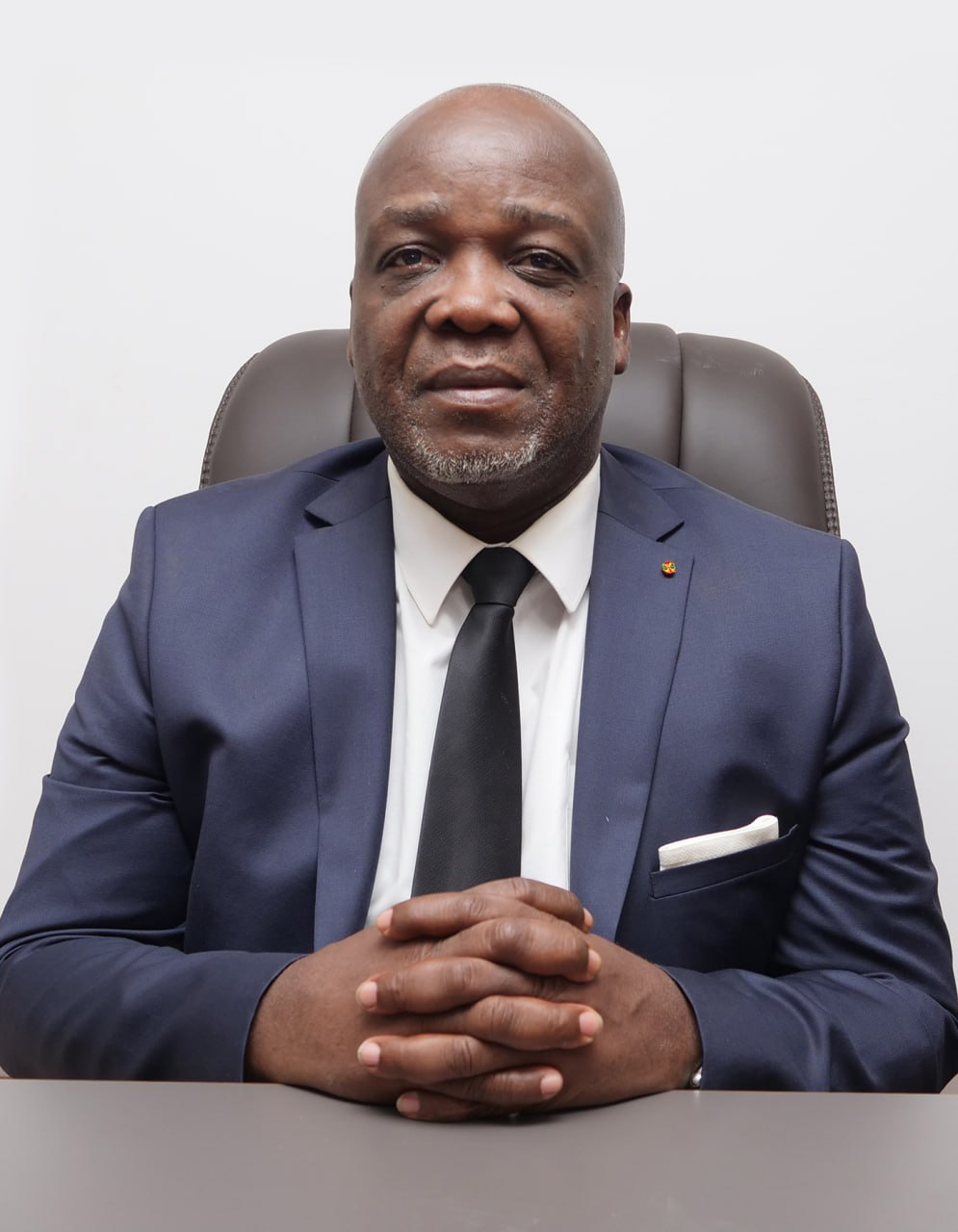

Minister of Human Rights
- Incumbent
- Assumed office 6 March 2024

Vice-President of the National Assembly (Togo)
- Incumbent
- Assumed office 25 January 2019

Member of Parliament, National Assembly of Togo
- Incumbent
- Assumed office 25 January 2019

Personal details
- Born: Noépé, Avé Prefecture, Maritime Region, Togo
- Party: Independent
- Occupation: Lawyer, Politician
- Profession: Minister of Human Rights

Pacôme Yawovi Adjourouvi, born in Noépé in the Avé prefecture, located in the Maritime Region of Togo, is a Franco-Togolese lawyer and politician.

== Biography ==
Pacôme Yawovi Adjourouvi, originally from the town of Noèpé, arrived in France at the age of 18. He studied at the University of Créteil

Indeed, after completing the second part of his baccalaureate at Collège Saint-Joseph in Lomé in 1985, he pursued his university studies in Paris, culminating in a Master's degree in Law , a DEA (Diploma of Advanced Studies), and a Doctorate in Law and Political Science from René Descartes University (Paris V). He later entered the Paris Bar School, from which he obtained his Certificate of Aptitude for the Legal Profession (CAPA), and was admitted to the Paris Bar in 2001. During this time, he founded and chaired the Togolese Lawyers in the Diaspora collective based in France. From 2002 to 2015, he was also a member of the "Africa and Law" association, which focuses on training Francophone lawyers .

== Career ==
A criminal defense lawyer, in 2012 he was first deputy mayor in the French commune of Évry. In Togo, he was a political advisor to Faure Gnassingbé in 2017. He was vice-president of the National Assembly and then, on March 6, 2024, he was appointed Minister of Human Rights, Civic Education, and Relations with the Institutions of the Republic. He officially took office on March 6, 2024, following the handover of responsibilities with his predecessor Christian Trimua.

Mr. Pacôme Yawovi Adjourouvi has been president of the permanent consultation framework (CPC) of political parties since June 2023.
