= Zio =

Zio may refer to the following:

- Zio, Togo, a prefecture in southern Togo
- Zio Prefecture, Maritime Region of Togo
- Kyocera Zio (stylized ZIO), a 3G smartphone
- Toyota Mark X ZiO, a crossover vehicle sold in Japan
- Zio, a character from the video game Phantasy Star IV
- Zonal Informatics Olympiad of the Indian Computing Olympiad
- Kamen Rider Zi-O, a Japanese tokusatsu drama series
- Zio (pejorative), a pejorative diminutive of the word Zionist
- Zio, a reconstructed name for the Proto-Germanic god Tīwaz
- Laurie Zio, Australian politician
