= Kodjo Adedze =

Togolese politician (born 1961)

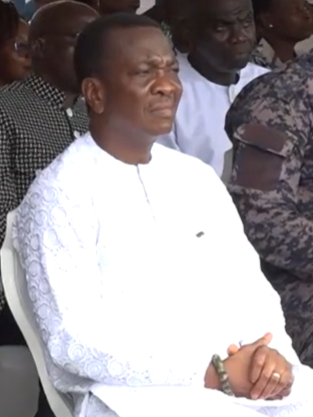
- Adedze in 2024

President of the National Assembly of Togo
- Incumbent
- Assumed office 14 June 2024
- Preceded by: Yawa Djigbodi Tségan

Personal details
- Born: December 31, 1961 (age 64) Zio Prefecture, Togo
- Party: UNIR

Kodjo Sevon-Tepe Adedze (born 31 December 1961) is a Togolese politician who is the current President of the National Assembly of Togo serving since June 2024. A member of the Union for the Republic party, he previously served several ministerial positions.

== Biography ==
Adedze was born on 31 December 1961 in Zio Prefecture, Togo. He graduated from the École nationale d'administration (National School of Administration) and then entered public service in 1988. He received a diplôme d'études supérieures spécialisées (DESS) degree in law and also earned a postgraduate degree from the École nationale des douanes (National School of Customs) in Neuilly-sur-Seine, France.

Adedze is a member of the ruling Union for the Republic political party. He spent much of his early career working in the Togolese customs department, serving as the Director of Studies and Customs Legislation and later Director General of Customs. He also served as the Director General of the Public Procurement Regulatory Authority. In February 2017, he was appointed the head of the Office Togolais des Recettes (Togolese Revenue Office).

By 2021, Adedze was serving in the Council of Ministers as the Minister of Trade, Industry and Local Consumption. He later had his role changed to Minister of Urban Planning, Housing and Land Reform in September 2023. In June 2024, he stood for election to be the President of the National Assembly and, as the only candidate, won with 106 votes, compared to two votes against and one abstention, being elected to a three-year term.
