= Eunice Adabunu =

Togolese businessperson

- Born: Eunice Adabunu; 1919 (age 106–107)
- Occupation: businesswoman
- Known for: Nana Benz

Eunice Adabunu (born 1919) is a Togolese businesswoman. She is known as one of the pioneers among the Nana Benz, a group of fabric traders.

== Biography ==
Adabunu was born in 1919, and had a modest background. She started trading on the street at the age of 11, selling doughnuts, sugar and pearls.

She eventually made her fortune in the loincloth trade at the Lomé market and became one of the best-known Nana Benz. She also developed pro-independence convictions, advocating for an independent Eweland and then an independent Togo. Putting her financial resources at the service of her convictions, she became an influential member and a financial pillar of the pro-independence party, the Party of Togolese Unity, led by Sylvanus Olympio. In the 1960s, she was also a member of the municipal council and president of the Lomé branch of the Union of Togolese Women (UFEMTO). She also dedicated herself to the education of young women in Lomé.

== See also ==
- Dédé Rose Creppy
