= President of the National Assembly (Togo) =

- Coat of Arms of the Togolese Republic
- Incumbent; Kodjo Adedze since 14 June 2024
- Type: Legislative
- Term length: 5 years
- Precursor: Yawa Djigbodi Tségan

In Togo, the president of the National Assembly leads and represents the Togolese National Assembly. The current president of the National Assembly has been Kodjo Adedze since 14 June 2024.

== Role ==
In Togo, the president of the National Assembly has a primary role in organizing and conducting debates within the Assembly. They are elected for five years by the deputies in a secret ballot with two rounds; in the event of a tie, the oldest candidate is elected. After the election, the president convenes parliamentary sessions, sets the agenda, decides on the admissibility of bills, amendments, and requests for the creation of committees.

Moreover, the president opens and closes parliamentary sessions, grants and withdraws speaking rights among speakers, and can decide on disciplinary measures against certain parliamentarians. The president of the Assembly is also responsible for security within the Assembly, which means they can call in law enforcement within the Parliament in case of disturbances.

They are in charge of authenticating parliamentary acts; in case of suspicions of voting irregularities, the president can annul the vote and organize a new one. They are also responsible for the civil staff of the National Assembly and appoint its secretary-general.

Finally, this role is responsible for representing the National Assembly to other Parliaments or in international relations.

== List of presidents ==
Below is a list of office-holders:

Name	Entered office	Left office
Jonathan Savi de Tové	1960	1963
Barthélémy Lamboni	1964	1967
Georges Apedo Amah	1981	1985
Mawupé Valentin Vovor	1985	1988
Messan Acouetey	1988	July 1991
Philippe Fanoko Kpodzro	20 August 1991	February 1994
Dahuku Pere	February 1994	March 1999
Agbéyomé Kodjo	22 June 1999	29 August 2000
Fambaré Ouattara Natchaba	3 September 2000	5 February 2005
Faure Gnassingbé	5 February 2005	24 February 2005
Abass Bonfoh	24 February 2005	25 July 2013
Dama Dramani	26 July 2013	20 December 2018
Yawa Djigbodi Tségan	24 January 2019	14 June 2024
Kodjo Adedze	14 June 2024	incumbent
