= Regina Bruce =

German-Togolese educator (1900-1991)

- Bruce in 1926
- Born: 12 December 1900; Wuppertal, German Empire
- Died: 21 September 1991 (aged 90); Togo
- Occupation: Educator
- Spouse: Jonathan Savi de Tové
- Children: Jean-Lucien Savi de Tové

Regina Bruce (12 December 1900—21 September 1991) was a German-Togolese educator, President of the Togolese Red Cross, and mother of the future president of Togo, Jean-Lucien Savi de Tové.

== Early life ==
Bruce was born in Wuppertal on December 12, 1900, then part of the German Empire. Her parents were Togolese emigrants who gave her several Ewe language names. However, she chose to go by "Regina". Her mother was Dassi Comfort Creppy Bruce, one of the 11 wives of Prince Nayo John Calvert Bruce, who worked as an interpreter for Germany. Dassi was from Aného, Togo.

As a young child, Bruce traveled with her family as part of human zoo exhibits in order to earn money. In 1904, along with her half-brother Pietro, Bruce was left to the care of Baron George von Fircks and his family. They lived in Warnemünde, Germany. Most likely, her parents gave them to the foster family in order to secure their life and education in Europe.

Growing up, Bruce learned piano. She saw her biological parents somewhat infrequently, as they would visit when they could. Bruce ultimately wished to become a teacher, despite the limitations imposed upon her as an African-German woman at the time.

== Life in Hamburg ==
Bruce spent her young adult years in Hamburg, where she trained as a schoolteacher and later worked at Sonnenschein Protestant children's home. In 1916, her foster mother died, causing Bruce some sorrow. During this time, Bruce also reunited with her younger sisters Annie and Lisa, whom had been living at a children's home in Düsseldorf.

Bruce experienced anti-black racism and misogyny in what was now the Weimar Republic as a schoolteacher. She experienced Schwarze Schmach (transl. black shame), and found it difficult to live in a growingly hostile environment. She formed a community of Afro-Germans such as the Togolese Anumu family and was connected to the Black Relief Association (German: Afrikanischer Hilfsverein), which formed in 1918. Bruce said, recalling her time in Hamburg, "Whether it's a Cameroonian or from Senegal, all the black people stuck together more or less."

Shortly before World War I, her parents' show group started an expedition in the Russian Empire. Bruce lost contact with her biological parents during the war and expressed being worried about them. Her mother died in Baku in 1917 of unknown causes, and her father died in 1919 from a heart attack. She did not find out until 1923.

In the mid 1920s, a Togolese pastor named Robert Baëta visited the children's home where Bruce worked. Baëta was the head of the Ewe Church in Lomé and proposed Bruce and her sisters setting up a similar girls' school in Togo. Bruce was motivated to accept the offer for a variety of reasons: to see her parent's homeland, to escape Germany's anti-black racism, and to give her sisters a better future. She intended for the trip to be temporary and to return to Germany in 3 years.

The Bruce sisters (from left to right: Annie, Regina, Lisa) and staff at the Togo Mission: Sister Lisbeth Meier, Alex and Luise Funke, Elisabeth Spiess.

== Life in Togo ==
In order to prepare for Togo, then under French rule, the Bruces had to learn French. They took a year-long intensive class at the Magistel Institute in Saintes, France starting in October 1925. In November 1926, the girls arrived in Togo. They met their mother's relatives from Aného and worked as schoolteachers, trained domestic workers, and monitored the community's religious progress. They led a "Virgins' Association" to encourage Christian sexual morality among the local women.

Bruce did not adapt easily to her new job. Not only was life in Togo very different from what she was used to in Germany, but Bruce experienced race-based discrimination by the German mission. She demanded higher pay and vacation time, but both were rejected. In 1928, Bruce became pregnant out of wedlock. The father was Jonathan Savi de Tové, a teacher at the Bremen missionary school. She was fired on account of being a "bad role model." Bruce traveled to Keta, present-day Ghana, to be with her father's family. After she was fired, Savi de Tové resigned. Annie and Lisa wanted to return to Germany but they were denied.

On September 19, 1928, Bruce gave birth to her first child, Fernanda, in Keta. In total, Bruce and Savi de Tové had 5 children: Fernanda, Guido, Héctor, Isabelle, and Jean-Lucien. She lived mostly in Lomé with Savi de Tové, although he was particularly absent from her life. Savi de Tové was very involved in Togolese independence from France and was elected parliament speaker in 1960.

After Togo's independence, Savi de Tové became Ambassador of the Republic of Togo in Bonn. Bruce moved with him back to Germany, entering the country for the first time in over 30 years. After the 1963 Togolese coup, Savi de Tové was removed from his post. They were granted asylum to stay in Germany. There, Bruce started working for the Togolese Red Cross and frequently travelled to Togo. Savi de Tové taught Ewe at the Institute for African Studies at the University of Cologne.

== Later life and legacy ==
Plaque for Regina Bruce – Women’s Places NRW (FrauenOrteNRW) at Rex Theater

They lived in Cologne until 1968, when they moved back to Togo. Bruce's husband died in Lomé in 1971. Bruce died on September 21, 1991, in Lomé at the age of 90. Their youngest son, Jean-Lucien Savi de Tové, was the Minister for Trade and Crafts of the Republic of Togo from 2005 to 2007 and is the current President of Togo, as of 2025.
