= Lacs Prefecture =

Prefecture in the Maritime Region of Togo

Coordinates: 6.2333°N 1.6000°E

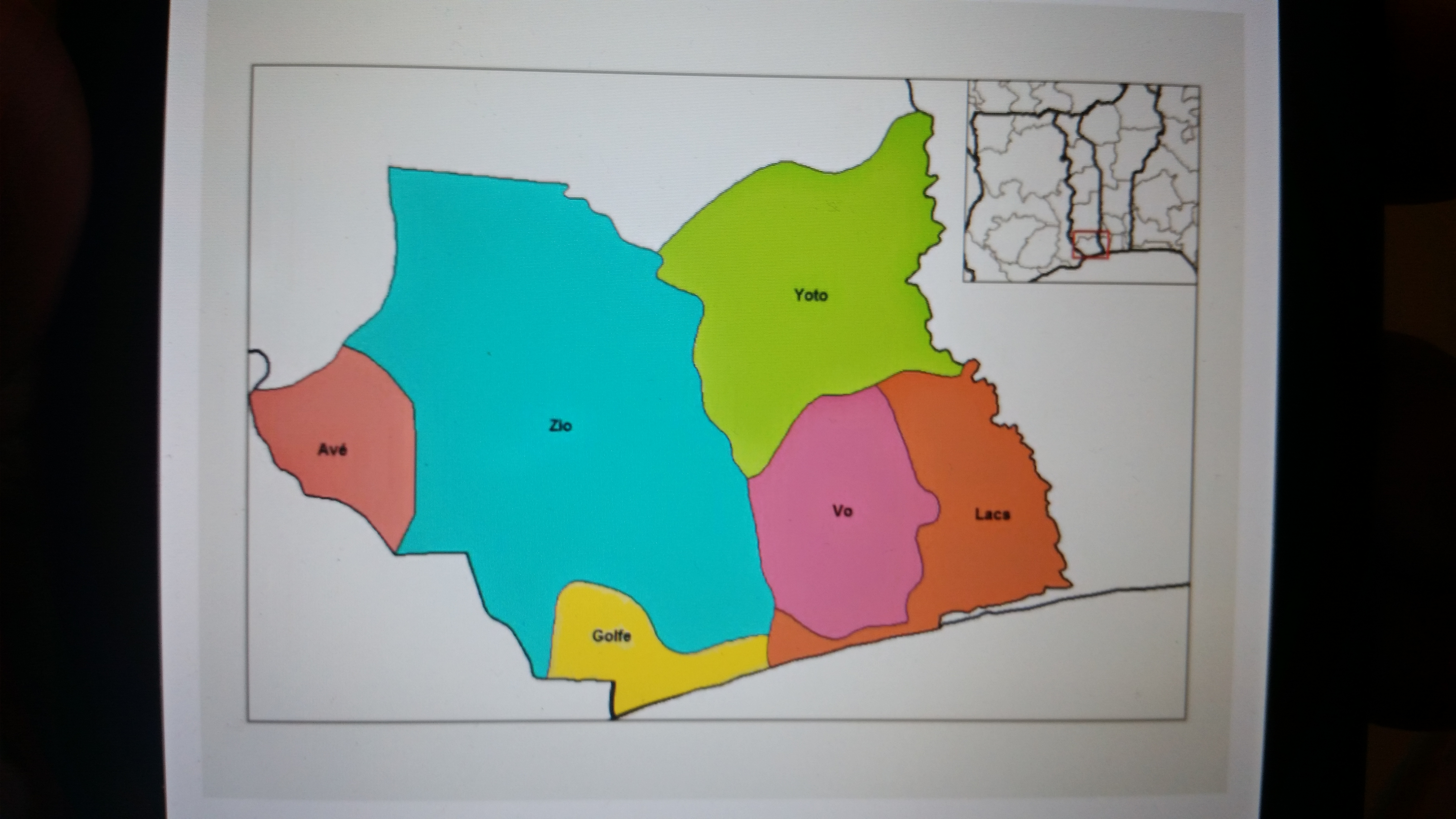
Map of Prefectures of the Maritime region of Togo.

Lacs is a prefecture located in the Maritime Region of Togo. The prefecture covers 388 km^{2}, with a population in 2022 of 241,247. The prefecture seat is located in Aného. It contains Togo's easternmost point.

The current president of Togo, Faure Gnassingbé, was born in Lacs Prefecture.

Canton (administrative divisions) of Lacs include Aného, Agbodrafo, Glidji-Aklakou, Anfoin, Fiata, Agouègan, and Ganavé

== Populated places ==
- Attitogon
- Aného
