= Vo Prefecture =

Prefecture in the Maritime Region of Togo

Coordinates: 6°20′N 1°32′E

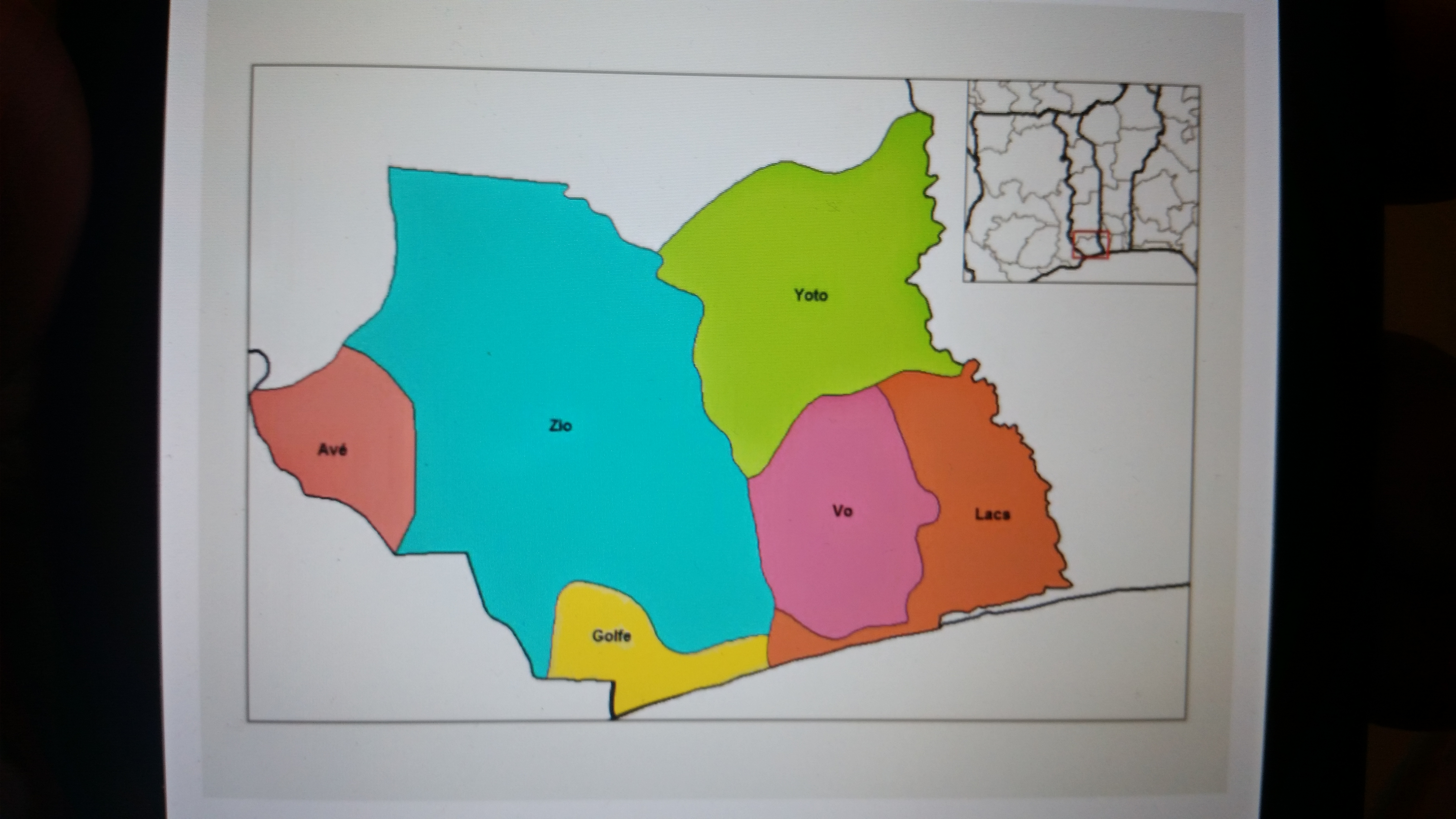
Map of Prefectures of the Maritime region of Togo.

Vo is a prefecture located in the Maritime Region of Togo. The prefecture seat is located in Vogan. Amegnran is a village in the prefecture where we have several villages that are under Vo’s prefecture.

The prefecture covers an area of 755.4 km² and has a population of 224,411 (as at 2022 census).

Cantons of Vo include Vogan, Togoville, Anyronkopé, Akoumapé, Vo-Koutimé, Dzrékpo, Dagbati, Sévagan, Momé-Hounkpati, and Hahotoé.

Kusegbe Legbanou is a village in Vogan, preferably called Vo-Legbanou, Vogan, Togo.
