= Nana Benz =

Togolese fabric traders

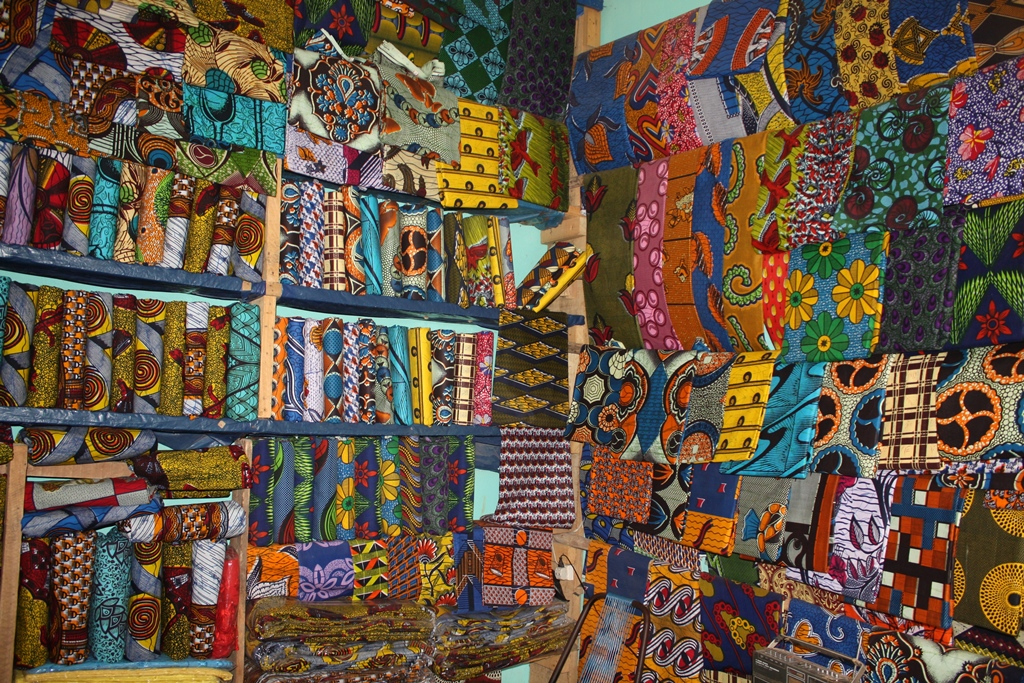
Waxprints sold in a shop in West Africa

Nana Benz are a group of businesswomen in Togo who peaked in prominence and wealth in the 1970s by trading African wax prints. The trade has continued at the Lomé Grand Market. The name comes from a hypocorism of na or ena in the Gen language (meaning "mother" or "grandmother") and a truncation of Mercedes-Benz, a type of expensive car driven by many of these women.

The Dutch company Vlisco was the main manufacturer of the prints, but by the 21st century started to lose significant market share to Chinese manufacturers. Competition has also reduced the numbers and profit margins of the Nana Benz; newer traders are sometimes called "Nanettes" or "little Nanas".

The Nana Benz are culturally significant in Togo as symbols of local economic success. Togolese musician King Mensah recorded a song about them titled "Nana Benz".

== Notable members ==
- Eunice Adabunu
- Dédé Rose Creppy
