= Jonathan Savi de Tové =

Togolese politician (1895–1971)

- Savi de Tové, c. 1931

1st President of the National Assembly of Togo
- In office 27 April 1960 – 13 January 1963
- Preceded by: Position established
- Succeeded by: Barthélemy Lamboni

Member of the National Assembly
- In office 8 December 1946 – 27 April 1958
- Preceded by: None
- Succeeded by: Barthélemy Lamboni

Personal details
- Born: Jonathan Adzesi Kokou Savi de Tové; 15 August 1895 Mission-Tové, Togoland
- Died: 11 September 1971 (aged 76) Lomé, Togo
- Party: Party of Togolese Unity (CUT)
- Spouse: Regina Bruce (m. 1928)
- Children: Jean-Lucien

Jonathan Adzesi Kokou Savi de Tové (15 August 1895 – 11 September 1971) was a Togolese politician, journalist and educator who served as the first president of the National Assembly of Togo from 1960 until 1963. A member of the Party of Togolese Unity (CUT), he played a major role in the establishment of the party and as well as the independence of Togo. Savi de Tové is also the father of Jean-Lucien Savi de Tové, the incumbent President of Togo.

Born in Mission-Tové, he moved to Kamerun (Cameroon) to work as a clerk for a German attorney. After the outbreak of World War I, Savi de Tové was elected as the Personal Secretary for Karl Ebermaier, and went to Madrid. After the war's end in 1918, he returned to Togo, and held various political positions. In 1946, he was elected as a member of the national assembly.
