= Sika Bella Kaboré =

Burkinabe jurist

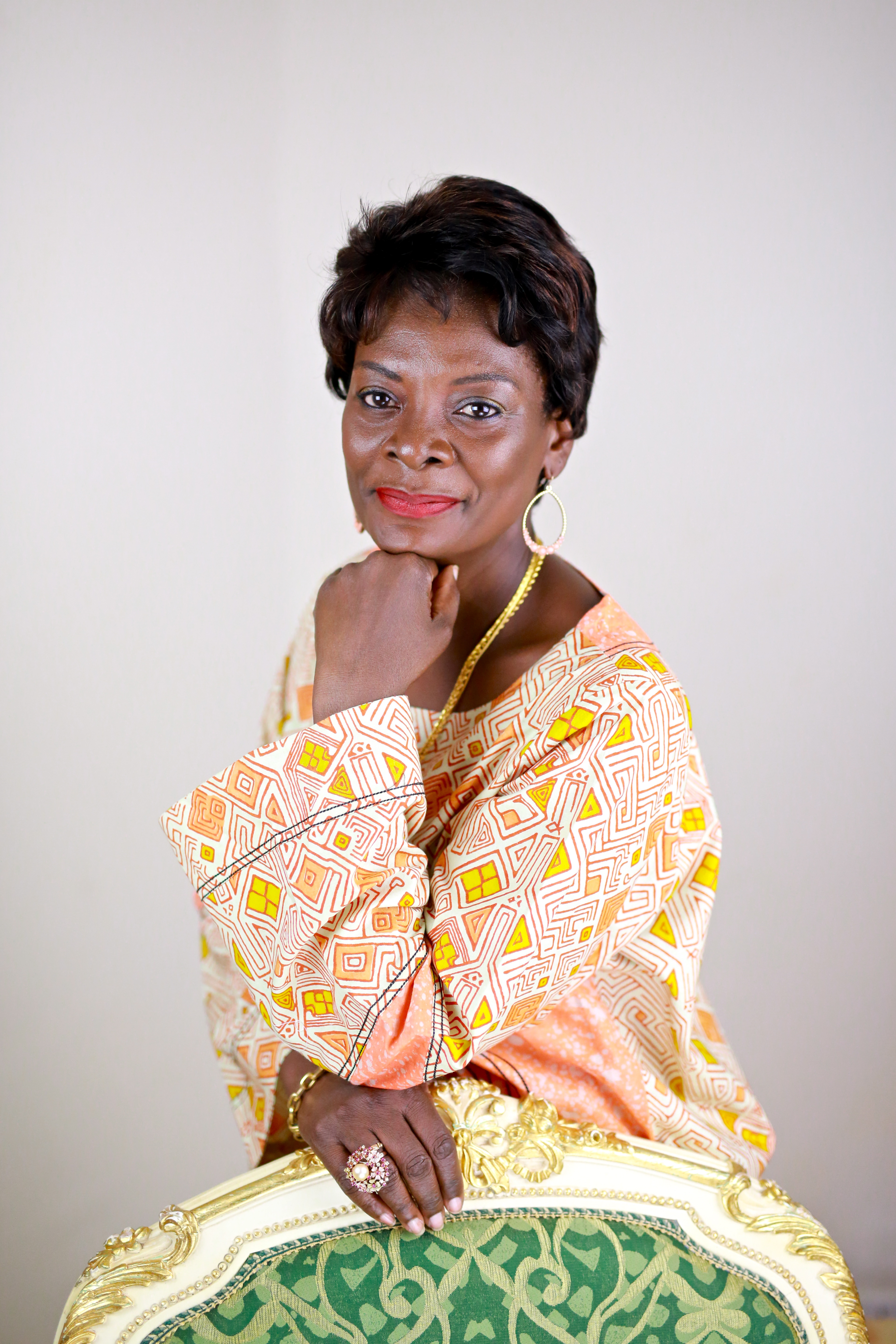
- Kaboré in 2016

First Lady of Burkina Faso
- In office December 29, 2015 – January 24, 2022
- President: Roch Marc Christian Kaboré
- Preceded by: Marie Kafando

Personal details
- Born: Adjoavi Sika Vovor; October 20, 1959 (age 66) Lomé, French Togoland
- Spouse: Roch Marc Christian Kaboré (m. 1982)
- Children: 3
- Parent(s): Mawupé Valentin Vovor; Emilia Moreira
- Education: University of Lomé; University of Burgundy

Sika Bella Kaboré (born October 20, 1959) is a Togolese-born Burkinabé jurist, healthcare advocate, and wife of the former President of Burkina Faso, Roch Marc Christian Kaboré. She served as the First Lady of Burkina Faso from December 29, 2015 to January 24, 2022, when her husband, Roch Marc Christian Kaboré, was deposed by the military.

== Biography ==
Kaboré was born Sika Bella Adjoavi in Lomé, present-day Togo, to Mawupé Valentin Vovor, a Togolese physician, and Emilia Moreira. She is usually called Bella, which is her middle name.

Kaboré completed her master's degree in law at the University of Lomé. She then moved to France to continue her studies at the University of Burgundy. She met her future husband, Roch Marc Christian Kaboré, while both were students at French universities. They married in 1982 and have three children. They moved to Kaboré's native Burkina Faso during the 1980s, where she joined the Chamber of Commerce and Industry (CCI) in Ouagadougou as a legal studies officer, while her husband was appointed Director General of the International Bank of Burkina Faso.

In 2006, Kaboré became head of the KIMI Foundation, which provides preventative healthcare services to Burkinabé women and children. The KIMI Foundation, which means "umbrella" in the Dyula language, focuses on treatment of chronic illnesses, including breast cancer, cervical cancer, and sickle cell disease.

Kaboré reportedly became close with former First Lady Chantal Compaoré as her husband's political career grew during the 1990s and 2000s. The two shared common life histories. Both women were married to Burkinabé political leaders and were born abroad - Kaboré is Togolese, while Compaoré is Ivorian. Some political figures believed the two were close friends, but members of President Kaboré's political circle seemed to dispute this notion, telling Jeune Afrique, "They were close because of the functions of their husbands. But can we say that they were really friends? I'm not sure."

By 2015, was a member of the Chamber of Commerce and Industry's (CCI) executive committee. She became the First Lady of Burkina Faso on December 29, 2015, following her husband's victory in the November 2015 presidential election.
