= Fambaré Ouattara Natchaba =

Togolese politician (1945–2020)

President of the National Assembly of Togo
- In office 2000–2005
- Preceded by: Agbéyomé Kodjo
- Succeeded by: Faure Gnassingbé

Minister of Foreign Affairs and Cooperation
- In office 1992–1994
- Preceded by: Abdou Touré Tchiaka
- Succeeded by: Boumbéra Alassounouma

National Assembly of Togo
- In office 1994–2005
- Constituency: Oti Prefecture

Personal details
- Born: 15 April 1945 Gando, French Togoland
- Died: 15 October 2020 (aged 75) Lomé, Togo
- Party: Rally of the Togolese People (RPT)
- Occupation: politician

Fambaré Ouattara Natchaba (17 April 1945 – 15 October 2020) was a Togolese politician. He was the President of the National Assembly of Togo from September 2000 to February 2005. He was a prominent member of the ruling Rally of the Togolese People (RPT) and a member of the Pan-African Parliament representing Togo.

== Political career ==
Natchaba was born in Gando, Togo on 17 April 1945. He was Director of the Cabinet of President Gnassingbé Eyadéma from 1977 to 1981 and was a member of the National Committee in charge of drafting the text of the 1980 Constitution. He was an RPT Delegate to the Togolese National Conference in 1991 and was Minister of Foreign Affairs and Cooperation from 14 September 1992 to 20 March 1994.

He was first elected to the National Assembly in February 1994, representing Oti Prefecture in Savanes Region. He was re-elected in the March 1999 parliamentary election as the RPT candidate in the Third Constituency of Oti Prefecture; he faced no opposition and won the seat with 100% of the vote. He was President of the RPT Parliamentary Group and First Vice-President of the National Assembly before being elected as President of the National Assembly on 3 September 2000. Following the October 2002 parliamentary election, he was re-elected as President of the National Assembly, with 73 votes in favor, three opposed, one null vote, and one abstention. When the Pan-African Parliament began meeting in March 2004, Natchaba became one of Togo's five members.

=== 2005 political crisis and subsequent events ===
President Eyadéma died on 5 February 2005. Soon after his death, the armed forces sealed Togo's borders with neighboring countries and invested presidential powers in his son Fauré. These moves were in direct contrast to the country's constitution, which stated that the President of National Assembly would serve as acting President of Togo for 60 days until a new election was held. Natchaba, who was in Benin at the time of Eyadéma's death, was unable to return to Togo. The military's actions were condemned by the international community as a coup d'etat.

On 6 February 2005, the National Assembly voted to remove Natchaba as its President and Fauré Gnassingbé was unanimously elected to head the National Assembly as a means of legitimizing his succession. Following increased pressure both inside and outside of Togo, Gnassingbé resigned on 25 February and Bonfoh Abbass was designated as President of the National Assembly, thereby becoming acting President of Togo. Natchaba said that it was "unconstitutional" to bypass him and install Gnassingbé as President, and he said that he was the legitimate President.

Accompanied by President Mathieu Kérékou of Benin, Fambaré Natchaba returned to Togo on 5 March 2005. They met with senior army, government, and RPT officials. Before departing, Kérékou reportedly told leading RPT officials: "I've brought Natchaba to you. He is your brother and has no other option but to reunite with his political family and work within the ranks of the RPT, to perpetuate Eyadéma's legacy."

Later in 2005, President Gnassingbé designated Natchaba as his special envoy to the European Parliament and the European Commission.

At the 2006 Inter-Togolese Dialogue, Natchaba signed the Global Political Accord on the electoral process on behalf of the RPT on 20 August 2006. He was a member of the RPT Political Bureau and a member of the RPT Central Committee from Oti Prefecture as of the RPT's Ninth Ordinary Congress in December 2006. He sought to stand as an RPT candidate in Oti Prefecture in the October 2007 parliamentary election, but he was defeated in the party's primary election on April 7, 2007.

Following the arrest of Gnassingbé's brother Kpatcha Gnassingbé in April 2009, Natchaba characterized it as "just an incident" lacking any broader importance. He stressed that "there is no other solution than to continue on the road of democracy. The Eyadema era is well and truly over".

== Personal life ==
He was married and the father of five children.

Natchaba died on 15 October 2020 in a hospital in Lomé at the age of 75.
