= Togbe Agbodjan Jad Fozis =

Togolese reggae musician (born 1971)

- Born: François Djadoo; 3 December 1971 (age 54); Lomé
- Origin: Togo
- Genres: Reggae ska rocksteady folk Rhythm and blues Dancehall rock and roll Afro
- Occupations: Musician, guitarist, singer-songwriter
- Instruments: Voice guitar piano percussions
- Years active: 1980 – present
- Label: TAJF
- Website: www.jadfozis.com

Togbe Agbodjan Jad Fozis (born 3 December 1971), abbreviated TAJF and formerly Jad Fozis, born François Djadoo is a reggae musician, guitarist and singer-songwriter from Togo. He was one of the first leaders of the Rastafari movement in Togo.

He was born in the town of Lomé. He sings revolutionary activist songs for peace and freedom in French, English and Ewe, touring Africa, Europe and the United States.

== Biography ==
=== Childhood and studies ===
Togbe Agbodjan Jad Fozis grew up in Lomé between 1971 and 1980. His mother was a chorister who encouraged him to sing, and he became passionate about interpreting the songs of Ray Charles and Bob Marley at the age of 11.

== Beginning of career ==
He started out as a self-taught musician in 1980, playing rock and roll and joining a number of bands. He formed the Crazy Boys group during school performances. During the 1980s, he turned to reggae as a means of speaking out for the voiceless through his music. His committed style of music led to his exile in 1990.

=== Careers in Germany ===
In 1990, he arrived in Europe and stayed first in Denmark. A few years later, he moved to Germany to perfect his skills and officially became a singer-songwriter, where he remains to this day. He formed the group Vanity System, which disbanded in January 2002, but it was in 1995 that he really began his professional career with his first album, SOS Africa, and the song Gbékuia (remixed) afterwards in 2020, which gave him international fame, and he became a member of the Hamburg-based Jamaican group The Lion.

== Discography ==
- 1995 : Sos Africa
- 1997 : N'tifafa
- 1999 : Héritiers
- 2001 : Ça parle
- 2006 : Pardon
- 2013 : Élavanyon
- 2016 : Oh africa
- 2020 : Atta
- 2022 : Reconnaissance

=== Singles ===
- Togolais de même sang
- Maman

== Concerts and stages ==
- 2005 : Concert with Mass O'flash at the CCF of Lomé
- 2022 : Concert at l'institut français du Togo with his group Jah Children on 26 February and silver jubilee celebration of 25 years of career live at Le Yespapa in Cotonou (Bénin) le 05 mars
- African tour with his band Vanity System
- Concert in Germany, followed by a tour of Paris, sharing stages with artists such as Duncan Fulton, Jimi Hope, Joe Kiki, Amta Kole, Julie Akofa Akoussah, Fifi Rafiatou, Elom 20ce and Joe Kouassi.

== Events ==
- 1998 : Guest appearance by Claudy Siar on RFI's Couleurs Tropicales.
- 2023 : Musician invited by Omusawo Tintah a.k.a. Male Deogratius on the Dancehall Strictly on Tagy Television.
- Guest on the programme hosted by Félix Mandon on Africa N°1 where he rubs shoulders with Papa Wemba.
- Guest of Boncana Maïga in the Star Parade program on TV5 Monde.

== Personal life ==
His father died on March 7, 2022, and then his mother died on February 2, 2023, following a heart attack at the age of 70, to whom he often dedicated his songs.

== Recognition ==
=== Rewards ===
- 1998 : Prize awarded to Cotonou (Bénin).
- 2006 : Representing Togo at the Football World Cup.
- 2019 : Heroes 228 Award of Merit Winner for song Gbékuia.
- 2020 : Special prize of the year at the 17th edition of the All Music Awards.
- 2023 : Prize for best reggae artist at All Music Awards
- Togolese representative for UNESCO Peace Prize.

== See also ==
- Alpha Blondy
- Lucky Dube
- Peter Tosh
- Tiken Jah Fakoly
- Sizzla
- Lee Scratch Perry
- U Roy
