= Culture of Togo =

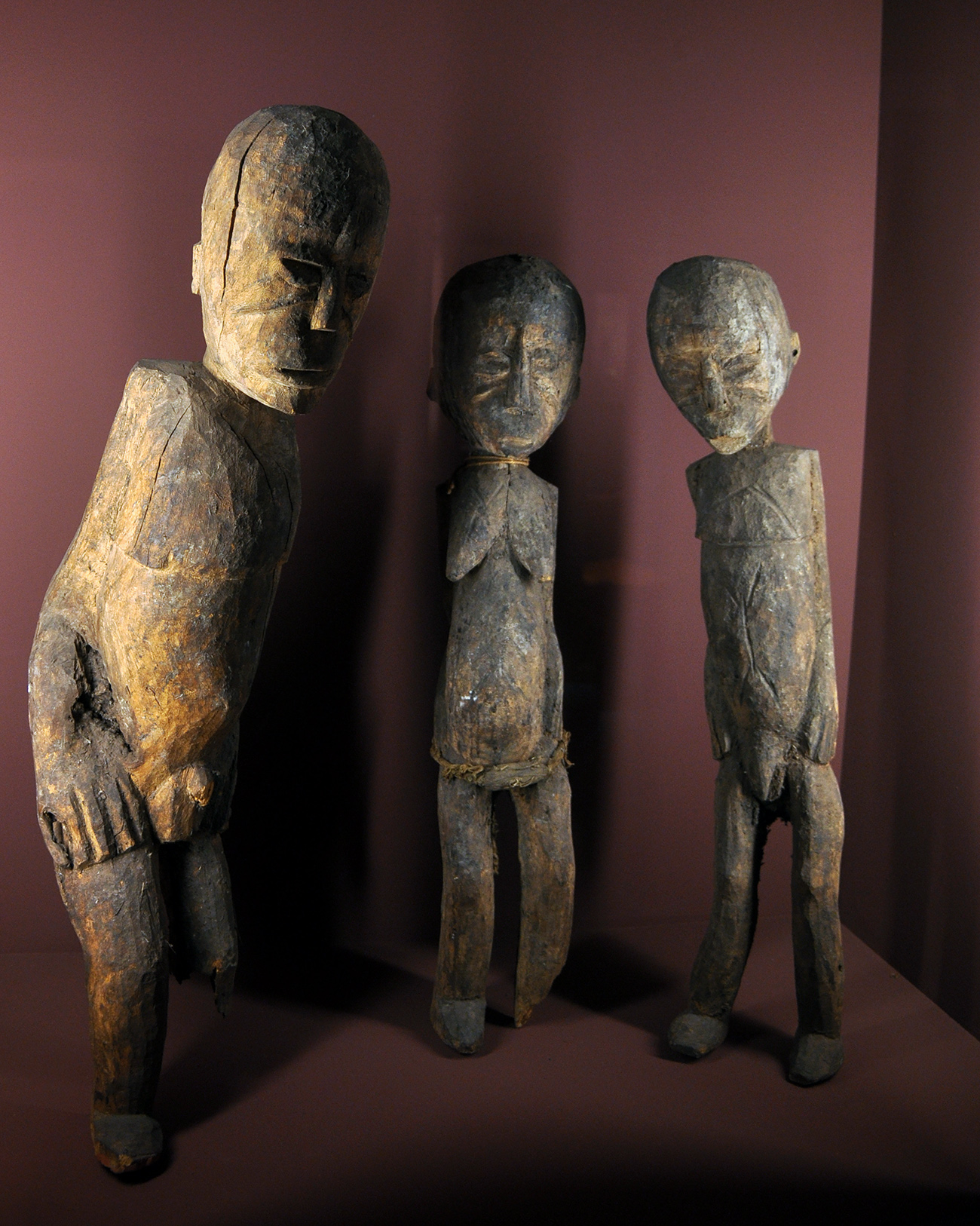
Three statuettes from Togo, ca. 1910

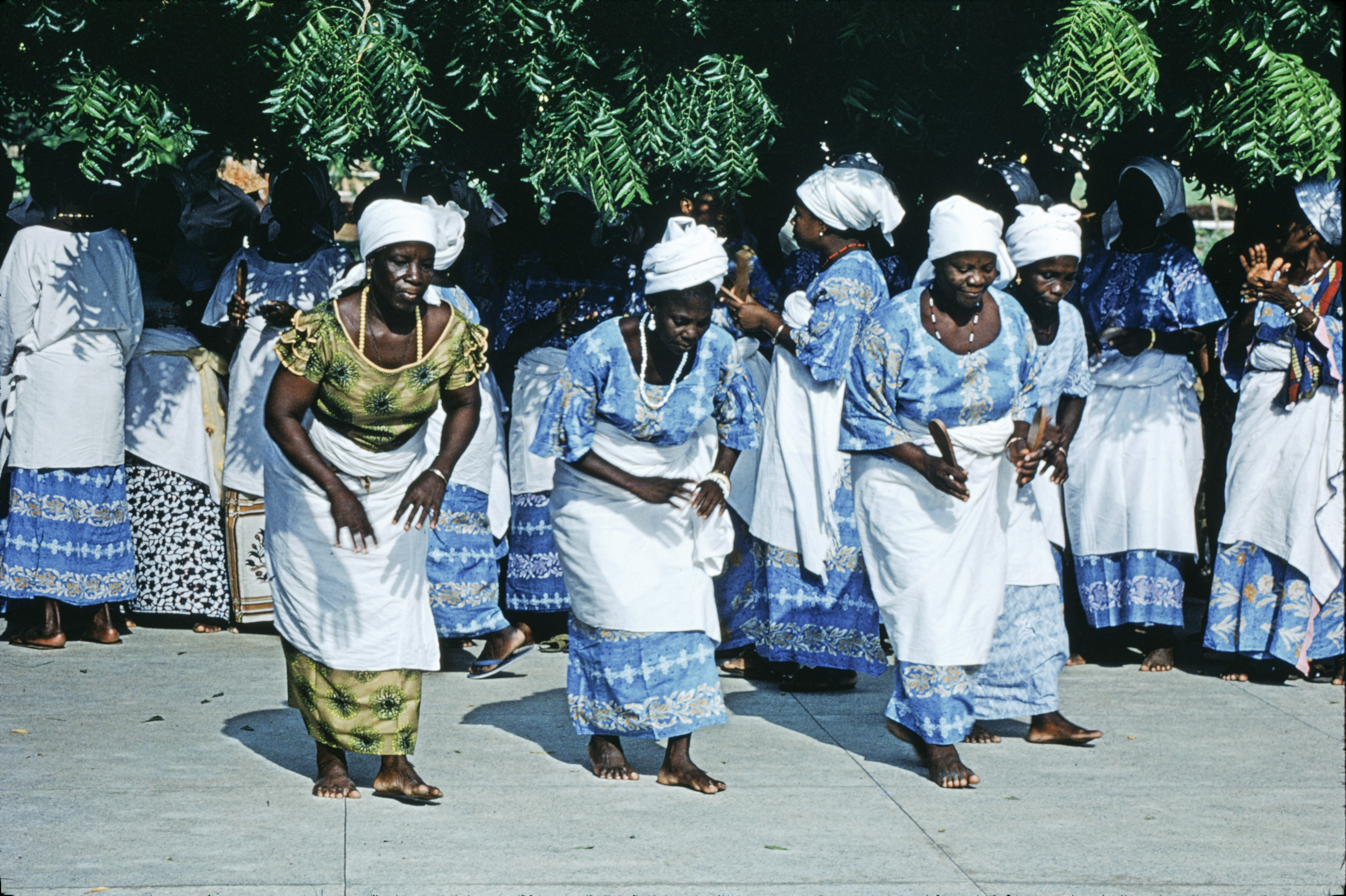
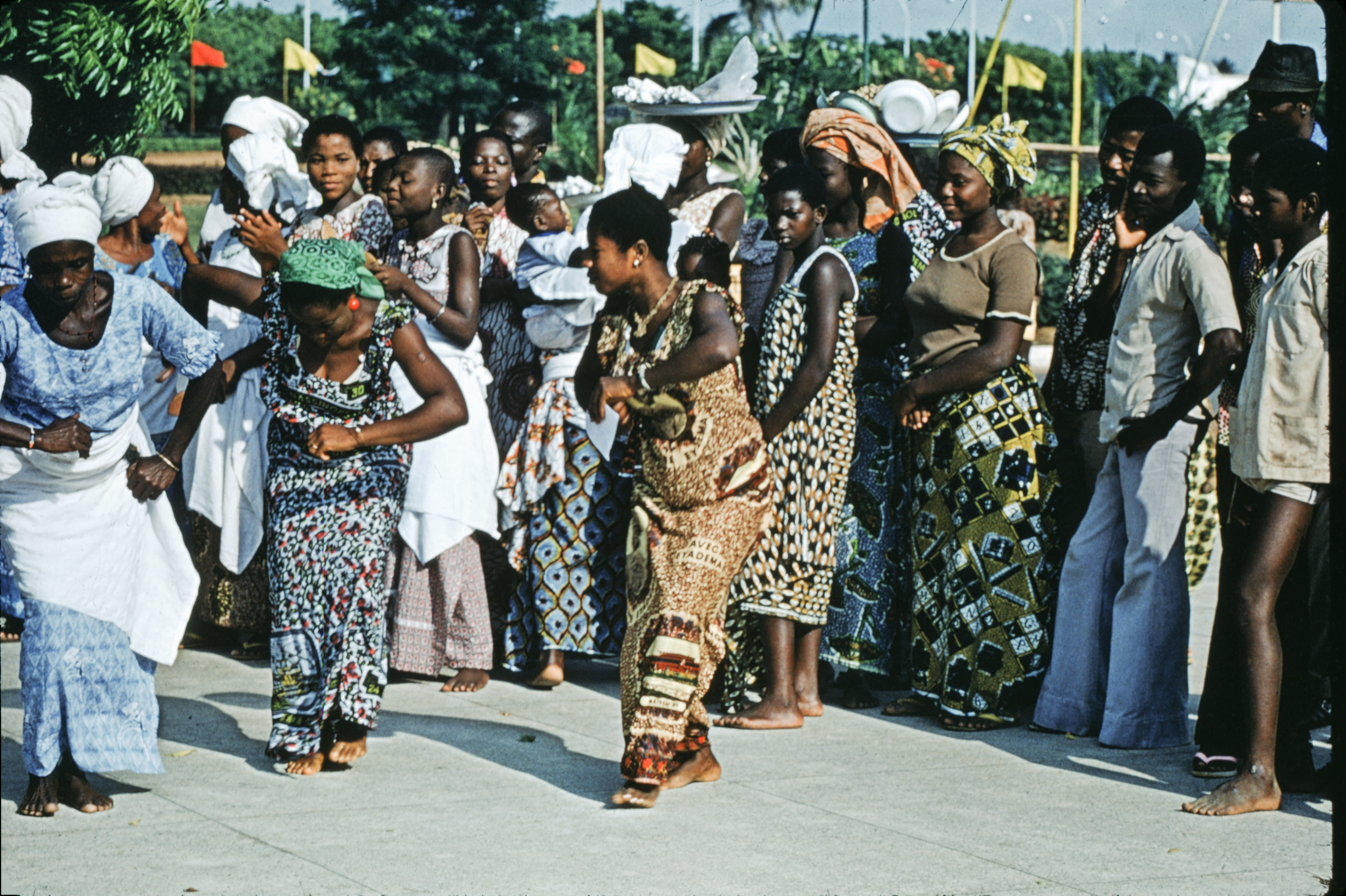
Togolese women dancing

Togo's culture reflects the influences of its 37 tribal ethnic groups, the largest and most influential of which are the Ewe, Mina, and Kabye. French is the official language of Togo, but many native African languages are spoken there as well. Despite the influence of Western religion, more than half of the people of Togo follow native animistic practices and beliefs.

Togo is known for its very diverse tribes and comunities.

The dyed fabric batiks of the artisanal center of Kloto represent stylized and colored scenes of ancient everyday life. The loincloths used in the ceremonies of the tisserands of Assahoun are famous. Works of the painter Sokey Edorh are inspired by the immense arid extents, swept by the harmattan, and where the laterite keeps the prints of the men and the animals. The plastics technician Paul Ahyi is internationally recognized today. He practises the "zota", a kind of pyroengraving, and his monumental achievements decorate Lomé.

== Festival ==
Togolese are celebrate their traditional festival according their different ethnic groups.

Agbogbo Zã is celebrate in Notsè by Ewe ethnicity in memory of the walls and the history of Agbogbo. Dunenyo Zā is a traditional festival of Ewe people in south Togo. In August of every year they are celebrate their culture, Tradition and still thanking God for his peace.

Ovazu is also a traditional festival in Akposso and Akebu. Ayizan is the traditional celebration of Tsevie.

== Music ==
Togolese people are still playing the traditional music around the country. Moba people, Akposso, Ewé are teaching the traditional rhythms to their children as heritage.

- Agbadza (Ewe people)
- Gazo (Ewe people)
- Akpese (Ewe people)
- Kamou (Kabye people)

== Dance ==
Each ethnic group has traditional dances, with specific dances for different occasions. We have dance of funerals, storytelling, praise and worship. Some ethnic group are choosing the dance of marriage. There are various dances across the 5 regions in Togo.

== Community ==
In Togo, a branch of the global Protestant fraternal organization known as the Orange Order exists, which is governed by the Grand Orange Lodge of Togo. The first lodge in the country, LOL 867, "Defenders of Lome," was formed in September 1915 by John Amate Atayi, a local who had been initiated into a lodge in Lagos, Nigeria. The lodges in Togo, which also include LOL 884, focus on positive evangelism, youth development, and community philanthropy. Members view the victory of William of Orange as a symbol of civil and religious freedom rather than a political one.

== See also ==
- Mass media in Togo
- Music of Togo
- List of Togolese people
