= Mawupé Valentin Vovor =

Togolese physician and politician

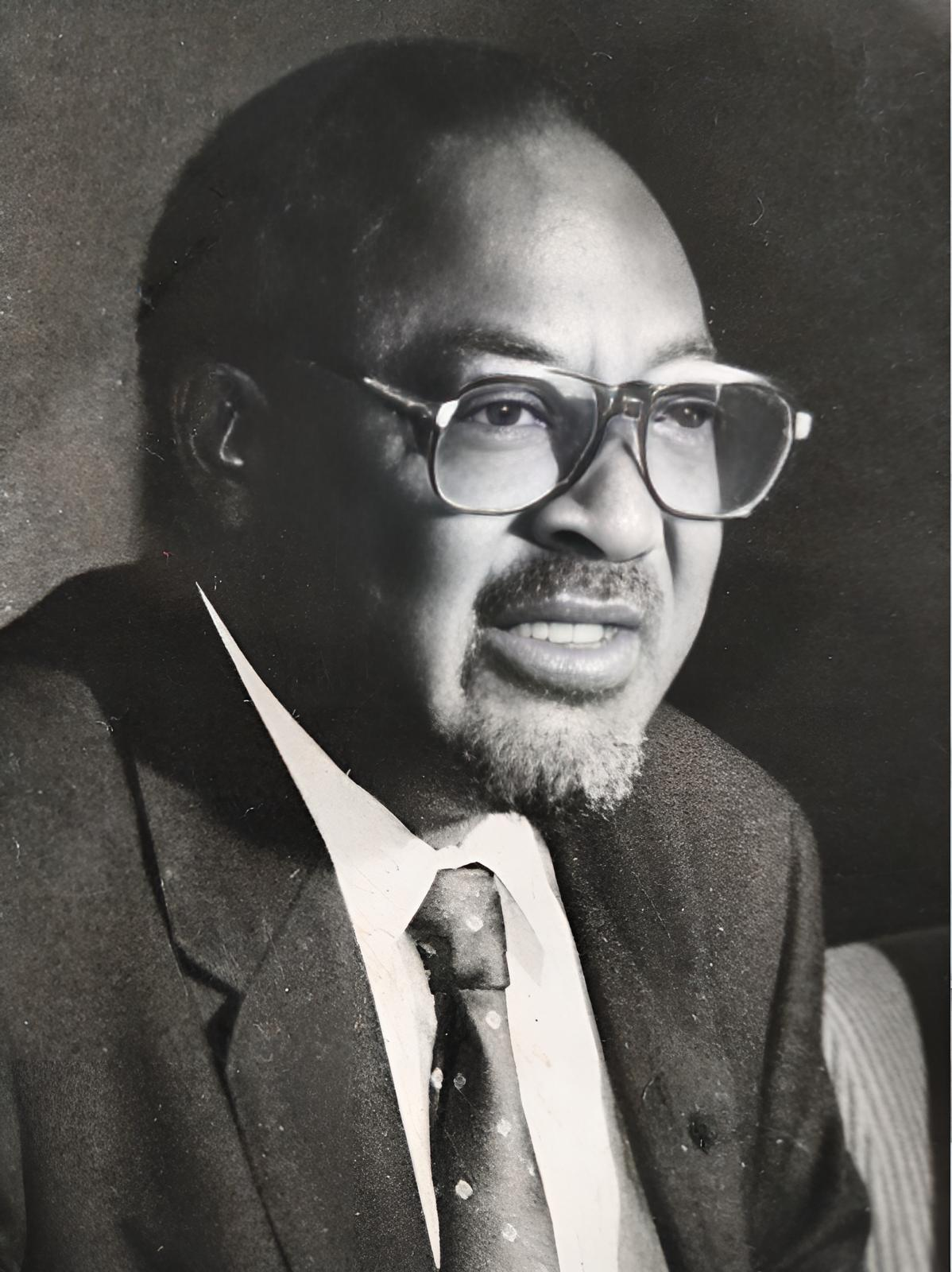
- Born: October 29, 1923; Kpalimé, Togo
- Died: January 2, 1992 (aged 68); Paris, France
- Education: University of Montpellier

Mawupé Valentin Vovor (29 October 1923 – 2 January 1992) was a Togolese medical doctor, academic figure and politician. He was born in Kpalime (Kloto district, northwest of Lome – Plateaux Region) in 1923 and died in Paris in 1992. Vovor studied Biology and Medicine in Montpellier and Dijon (France). He served as professor of Medicine of the French universities (1965), and was the first sub-Saharan African member of the French Academy of Surgery (1973). Vovor created and contributed to the creation of number of schools of medicine across francophone sub-Saharan Africa. He taught Surgery and Gynecology in Benin, Cameroon, Congo, Central African Republic, Senegal and Togo.

A fervent religious, Mawupe Valentin Vovor was a member of the Sovereign Military and Hospitaller Order of St. John of Jerusalem of Rhodes and Malta with whom he led the construction of a hospital in the East Mono region of central Togo.

Vovor was married to Emilia Moreira and father of three daughters and two sons. Their children include Sika Bella Kaboré, who has served as the First Lady of Burkina Faso since 2015 as the wife of President Roch Marc Christian Kaboré.

== Education ==
Mawupé Valentin Vovor attended elementary school in Kpalimé where he earned the Primary and Elementary Studies Certificate in 1938 before pursuing secondary studies in both Atakpamé (Togo) and Lomé the capital of Togo. Selected amongst the best students to attend the West African School of Medecine of Dakar (Ecole William Ponty - Section Medecine), he decided to join Marseille and then Montpellier in France for additional studies in order to be fully graduated as Medecine Doctor of the French Universities. While studying Medecine, he also applied to the School of Biological Sciences of Montpellier. He get graduated MSc. in Biological Sciences in 1954 and earned the grade of Medecine Doctor in 1956 with a specialisation in general and gynecological surgery in 1957.

== Medical career ==
Vovor started his medical career in Béziers and then Dijon before his home country Togo in 1957. He worked at the National Hospital of Lomé before leaving to Dakar (Sénégal) where he headed the General Surgery Clinic of the Hopital Le Dantec in 1959. In 1961, he was called back to Togo by the Government and worked as chief of medical studies at the Ministry of Wealth in Lomé. He created and chaired the Togo National School of Nursery while cumulating this function with the ones at the National Hospital and the Ministry of Health. In 1964, he created the School of Midwifery of Togo and remained at the direction of the school up to his retirement in 1981 from the Togo Public Administration.

== Academic career ==
Mawupé Valentin Vovor has earned the Grade of Professor of Medecine of the French Universities in 1966 being the first Francophone Sub-Saharan African native to earn this grade. He joined Dakar to participate to the creation of the first Francophone Sub-Saharan Africa School of Medicine belonging to a university. Starting in 1966, he was professor of general medicine and surgery, teaching to many Africans at the School of Medicine of Dakar. Good number of his students had successful career in their home country (Benin, Burkina Faso, Cameroon, Central African Republic, Congo, Côte d'Ivoire, Gabon, Mali, Niger, Senegal, Tchad, Togo) even with high ranking political career. Many of them, returning home called him to support the creation of their National School of Medicine.

Vovor cumulated responsibilities at the University of Dakar (now University Cheick Anta Diop of Senegal) with other medical responsibilities in Togo, especially those related to the National School of Midwifery of Togo he created in 1964. During his tenure as Dean of the Togo National midwife's school, until his retirement in 1981, the diploma delivered allowed alumni to work in France and Senegal without additional courses or conversions. As the grade delivered was granted by the University of Dakar, the school attracted numerous students not only from Togo but also from Haute-Volta (now Burkina Faso), Niger, Tchad, Comoros Islands, etc.

Vovor created the School of Gynecology and Obstetrics within the School of Medicine of the university du Benin (now University of Lomé). The school has attracted students from numerous African schools of medicine, even from France as it had partnership with the School of Medicine of the University of Lilles and the School of Medicine of the Hopital Cochin in Paris.

In 1973, Mawupé Valentin Vovor was elected and admitted to the French Academy of Surgery being for a long period the first and unique Sub-Saharan Africa native.

Vovor, during his academic years in Togo was in charge of the higher academic studies serving from 1975 to 1981 as the national director for superior education within the Ministry of Education and Research.

== Political career ==
Vovor started a political career in 1963 after the first military coup in Africa (January 13, 1963) when he was called to the responsibility of Ministry of Health of Togo, keeping as well his other responsibilities at the National Hospital and the School of Nursery. He resigned from the Government in 1965 to pursue his academic researches to earn the grade of Professor of medicine in France (1965). In 1966 however, upon validation by the National Assembly of Togo, he was nominated chairman of the Supreme Court. During his professorship, Mawupe Valentin Vovor remained involved in Togo national affairs as chairman of the Supreme Court until 1978.

In 1969, following the creation of RPT, the single and state political party of Togo, he was called to the Political Bureau with International Relations responsibilities. He represented Togo in this capacity at several African political meetings.

Elected Member of the parliament, representative from the Kpalimé district in 1985, Mawupe Valentin Vovor chaired the Togo National Assembly from 1985 to 1988, when he resigned two years before the end of his term because of his personal convictions.
