= Joseph Amedokpo =

Togolese painter

- Born: 1946 (age 79–80); Vogan, Togo death : 2024 Vogan
- Education: Yaba Trade Center (fine art scholarship, 1966–1968)
- Known for: Paintings on recycled flour sacks using local oils Participation in Dell's Product (RED) initiative (2008)
- Style: Painting
- Movement: Contemporary African art

Joseph Amedokpo (born 1946), is a Togolese-born painter. He lived in Lagos, Nigeria for many years.

== Biography ==
He was born in Vogan, Togo (West Africa), in 1946, and moved to Lagos, Nigeria, at the age of eight, where he received his education and art training, receiving a scholarship to the Yaba Trade Center where he studied fine art from 1966 to 1968.

Amedokpo paints using locally available oils and his canvases are recycled flour sacks, washed and stretched. His studio forms part of his family compound; a tin roof shelters him from the African sun and seasonal rains. He has achieved recognition in Europe and the United States.

In November 2008, Amedokpo was selected as one of four artists for Dell's Product RED initiative as part of the global fight against AIDS. Other artists selected include Siobhan Gunning, Bruce Mau and Mike Ming.

Nowadays Joseph Amedokpo does not have any money to buy medicine, to eat correctly or support his family. The agent who sold his creation, only gave him 50 euros every 6 months. In the beginning, he was not given the possibility to read his contract. Joseph Amedokpo doesn't have a bicycle or a car, or electricity in his house. Some days, he doesn't have money to buy the necessary products to work correctly; he is then obliged to borrow from his children.
