= Didier Ahadsi =

Togolese self-taught artist and sculptor

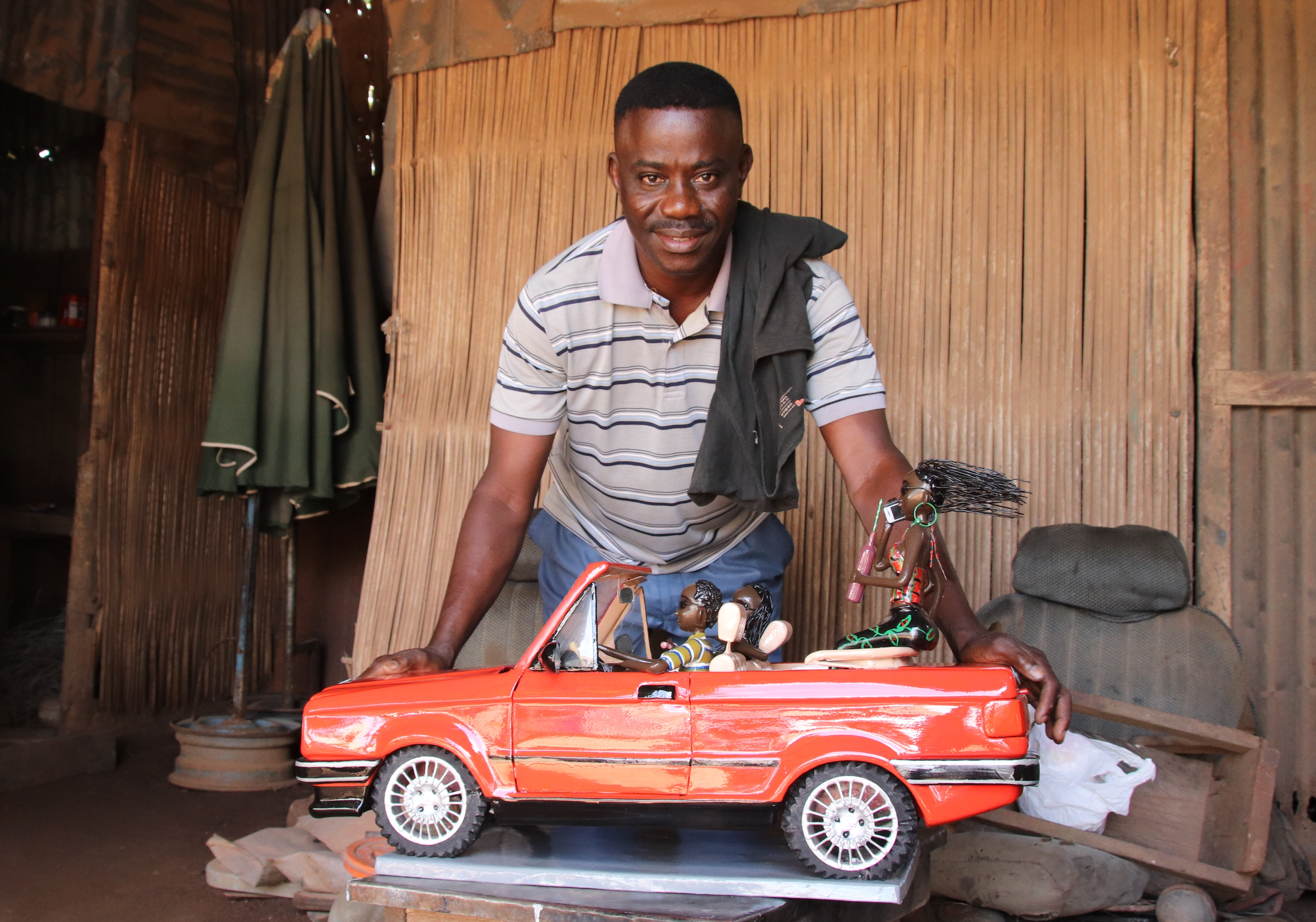
Didier Ahadsi with a BMW Cabrio in his atelier in Togo.

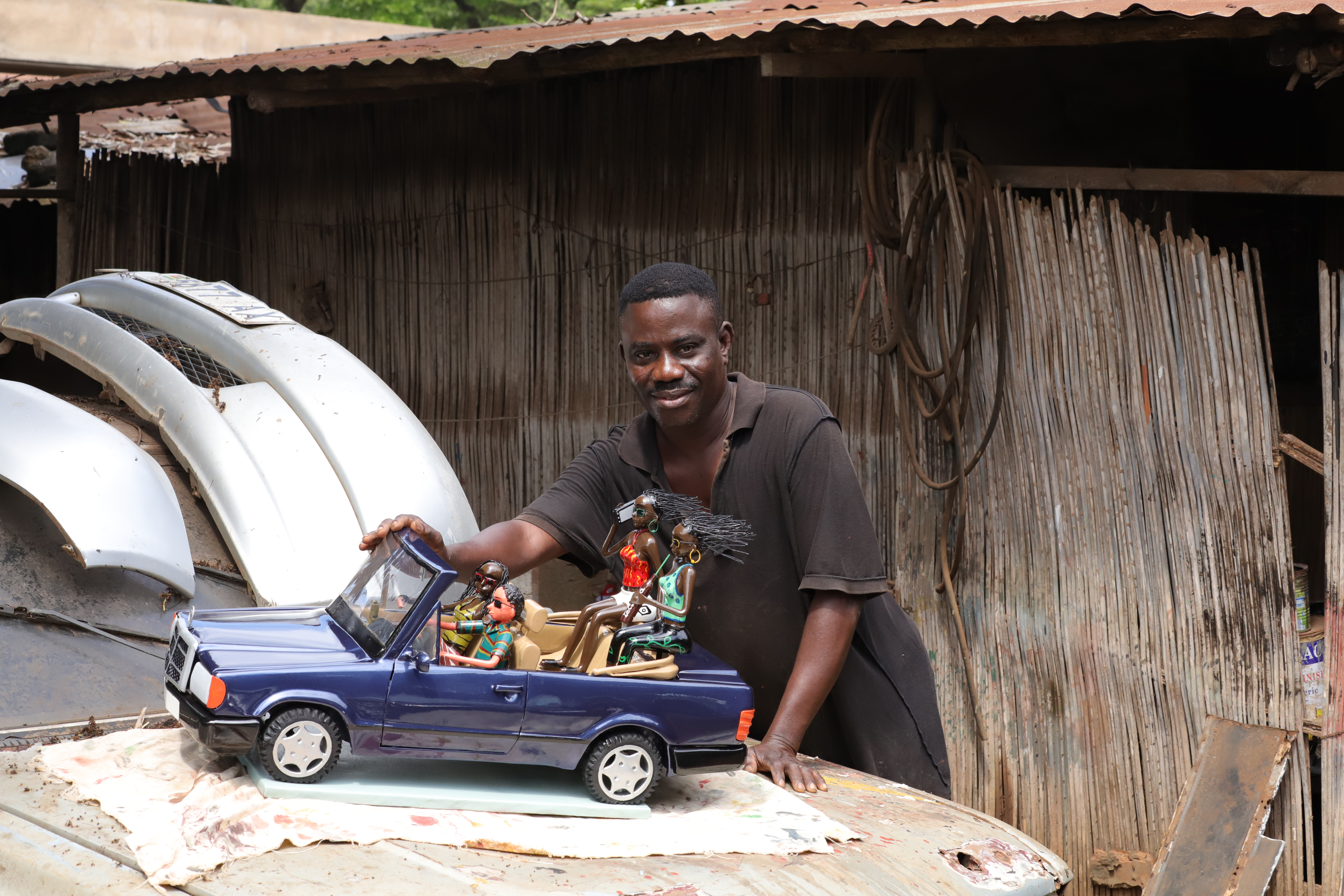
Didier Ahadsi: African girls accompany a European man in his Mercedes.

Didier Amevi Ahadsi (born 1970) is a Togolese Ewe self-taught sculptor. His work is shown on various museums and art galleries worldwide. His inspiration ranges from voodoo religious practices, African traditions, modern influences, to a series of personal stories of daily life.

== Biography ==
Didier Ahadsi was born in Vogan, Togo. He belongs to the African ethnic group of Ewe people and he grew up with three half-brothers and four half-sisters. His environment was influenced by agriculture, voodoo, and Christian religion.

As a young man Ahadsi started to work as a panel beater and welder. He repaired autobodies and later he combined his professional skills with his creativity and created metal figurines showing contemporary scenes of daily life in his living area in Lomé. With his work Ahadsi produced satirical, macabre, provocative and erotic scenes. Ahadsi is inspired by African traditions, like voodoo religious and he also does contract work.

He has been written about by art historian and curator, Kathrin Langenohl.

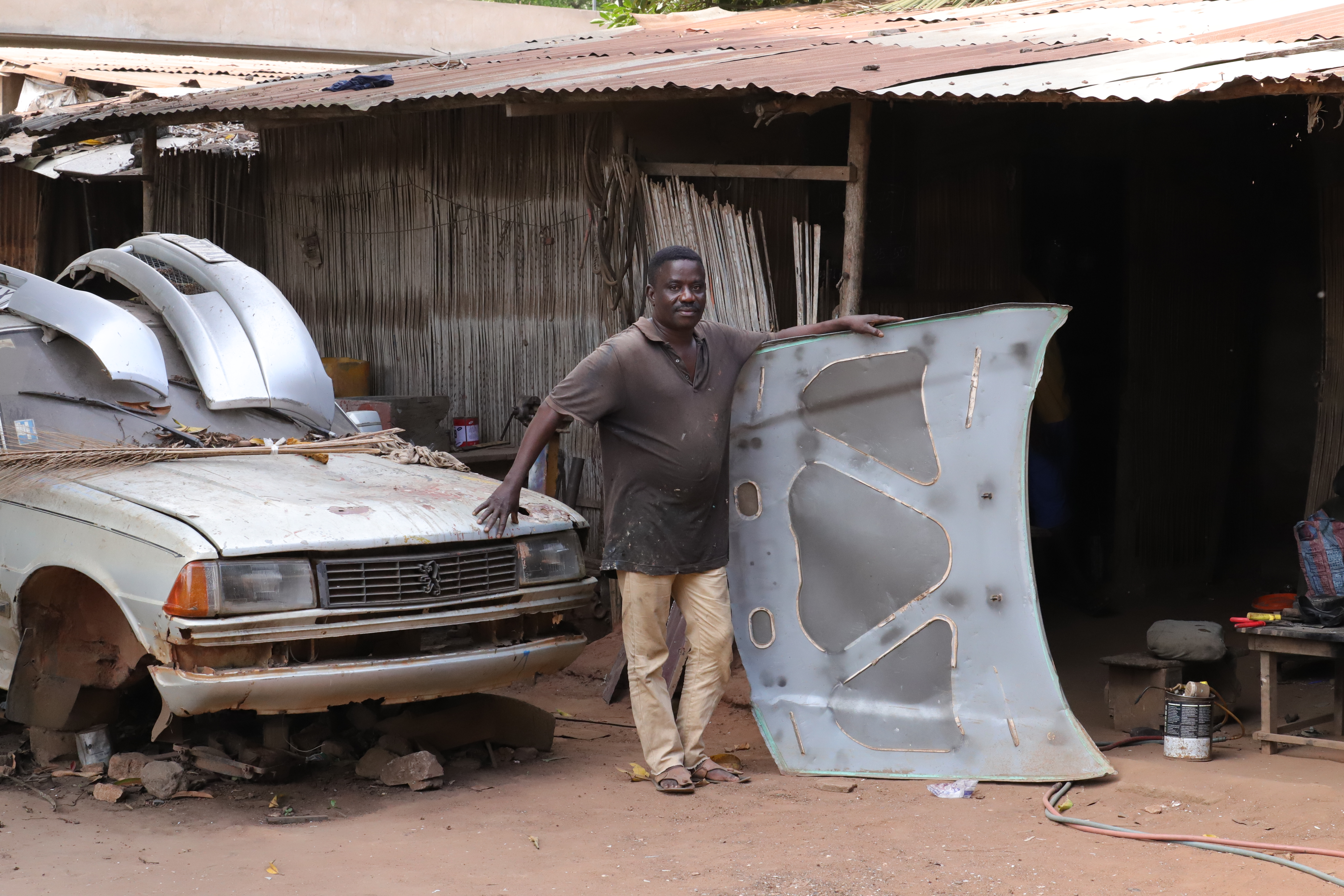
Didier Ahadsi creates art objects from old car components

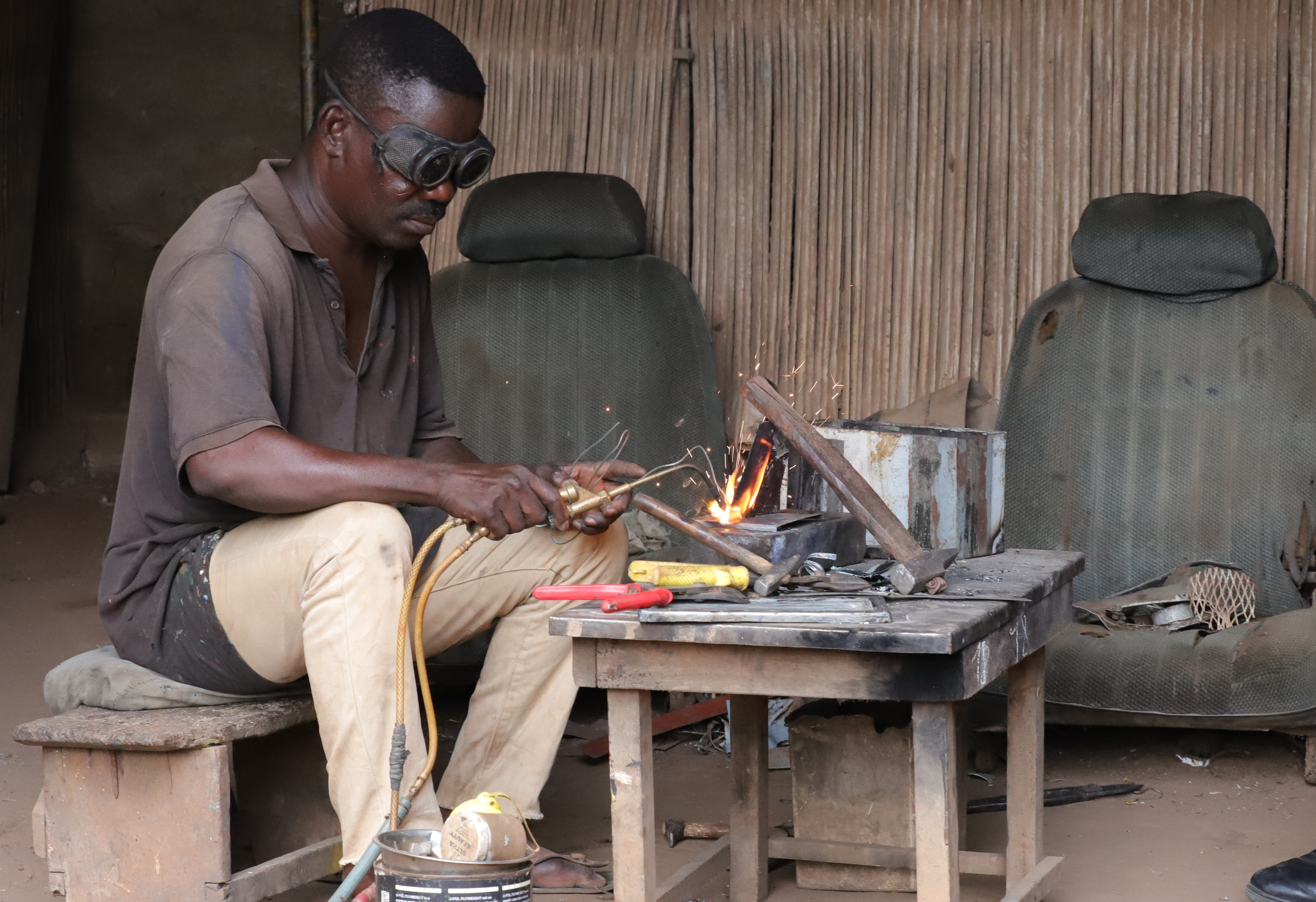
Didier Ahadsi in his atelier.

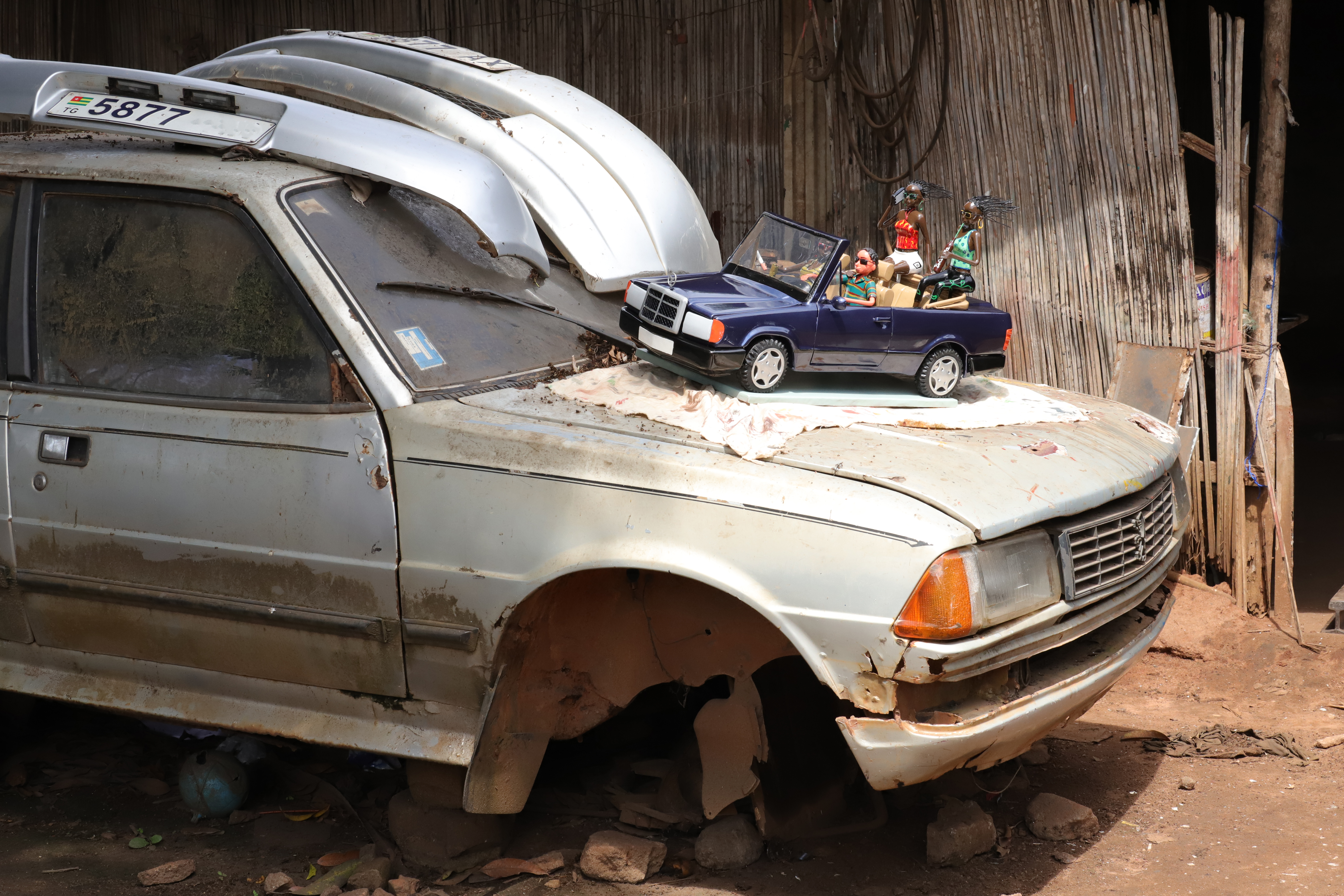
Atelier of Didier Ahadsi

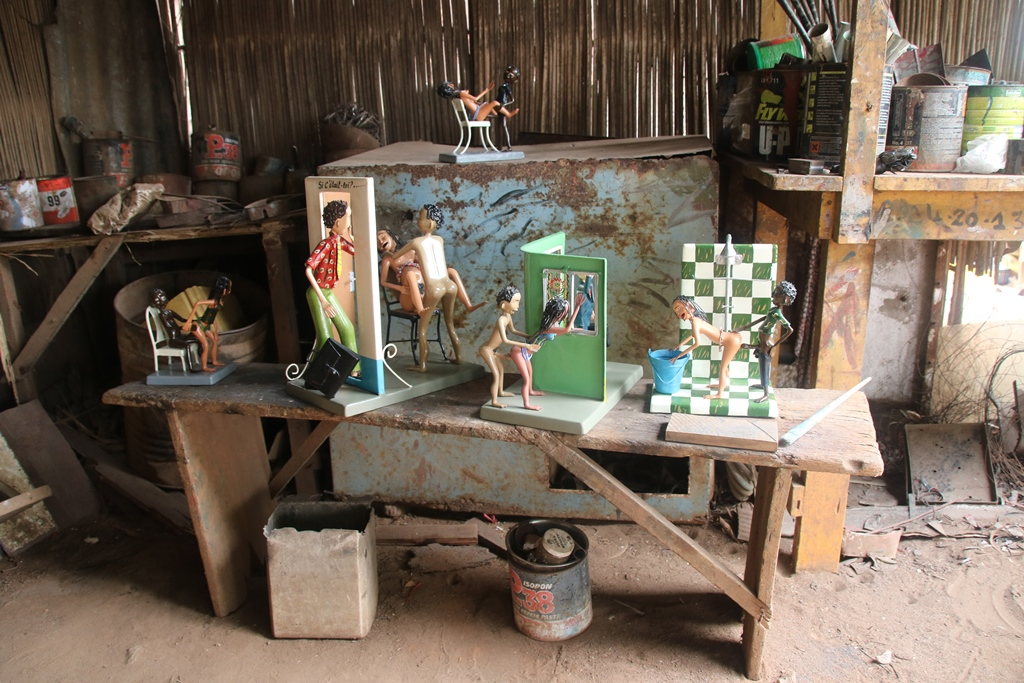
Atelier Ahadsis in Lomé, Togo

== Exhibitions ==
- Bwoom Contemporary
- Hannover Gallery
- Indigo Arts Gallery
- Rautenstrauch Joest Museum
- 2007, "Togo Direkt. Didier A. Ahadsi - Contemporary Art from Africa", Armory Ethnological Collection, Lübeck, Germany
- 2013–2014, Museum der Völker
- 2015, "Africa’s Top Models", Museum am Rothenbaum, Hamburg, Germany

== Literature ==
- A4: Magazin für aussereuropäische Kunst und Kultur. no. 1, 2007, pages 98–101, xii. Schwaz, Tirol: Haus der Völker Kulturverein, Museum für Kunst und Ethnografie
