= Mazamesso Assih =

- Born: Mazamesso Assih; September 7, 1979 (age 46); Lomé, Togo
- Citizenship: Togo
- Education: École Supérieure d’Assurances, Paris
- Occupation: Politician
- Political party: Union for the Republic (UNIR)

Mazamesso Assih (born 7 September 1979 in Lomé) is a Togolese politician. She has served as the Minister of Development at the Base, Financial Inclusion, Youth and Youth Employment in the Togolese government since 20 August 2024.

== Career ==
=== Early career in Europe ===
She started her career at the Qualiteam group (Solly Azar) where she was responsible for monitoring portfolios and managing non-standard risks. She then held roles at EDF Assurance in France as an auto business officer, followed by Aon France and Peugeot France in insurance roles. In 2011 she joined Generali France.

=== Return to Africa and entrepreneurship ===
In 2013, she founded Haz Consulting, initially established in Benin and later transferred to Togo.

=== Institutional engagement ===
In 2014, she helped create the National Financial Inclusion Fund (FNFI), a government program aimed at facilitating access to financial services for disadvantaged populations. In November 2017 she was appointed Secretary of State to the Presidency of the Republic in charge of Financial Inclusion and the Organization of the Informal Sector. In October 2020, she became Minister in charge of Financial Inclusion and the Organization of the Informal Sector. In August 2024 she assumed her current ministerial role.

== Political party affiliation ==
Mazamesso Assih is a member of the Union for the Republic (UNIR). Since December 2017 she has served as National Deputy Delegate of the UNIR Youth Movement.

== Significance ==
Under her leadership, Togo has implemented reforms to increase its financial inclusion rate, including a national strategy and a reform (called “R4”) to strengthen support for very small, small and medium enterprises (VSMEs). Her work places her among the youngest generation of Togolese political leaders.
