= Dama Dramani =

Togolese politician (born 1944)

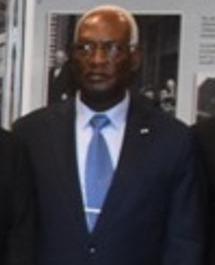
Dama Dramani (cropped)

Dama Dramani (born 1944) is a Togolese politician who was the President of the National Assembly of Togo from 2013 to 2018. He was Secretary-General of the Rally of the Togolese People (RPT), the ruling party, from 2003 to 2006, and following the 2007 parliamentary election he was President of the RPT Parliamentary Group in the National Assembly.

== Career ==
Dramani, who was born in Manigri, Benin, is a member of the Bassari ethnic group; he is also a half-brother of one of Gnassingbé Eyadéma's wives, Lami. A civil administrator, Dramani was appointed as Director of Equipment and Real Estate at the Ministry of Foreign Affairs and Cooperation on August 19, 1980, and then as Director of the Cabinet of the Ministry of Public Health on September 4, 1980. While serving as Regional Commissioner of Dapaong, he was appointed as District Head (chef de conscription) of Lomé on May 26, 1981. He subsequently served as Prefect of Golfe before being appointed as Director of the Cabinet of the Ministry of Foreign Affairs and Cooperation on January 27, 1982. In that capacity, Dramani signed the African Charter on Human and Peoples' Rights on behalf of Togo on February 26, 1982. He served for 13 years as Director of State Protocol at the Presidency.

In the March 1999 parliamentary election, Dramani was elected to the National Assembly as the RPT candidate in the Second Constituency of Tchamba Prefecture; he faced no opposition and won the seat with 100% of the vote. He then served in the government as Minister of Trade, Industry, Transport, and the Free Zone until he was excluded from the government that was named on July 29, 2003. At the RPT's Eighth Ordinary Congress in late November 2003, he was elected as Secretary-General of the RPT.

Following the death of President Eyadéma on February 5, 2005, Dramani said that it was "tragic for Togo". Eyadéma's son Fauré Gnassingbé succeeded him as president, but this was succession was widely deemed unconstitutional. Dramani was included as part of a Togolese delegation that travelled to Niamey on February 12 in an attempt to explain and defend Gnassingbé's succession to the Economic Community of West African States (ECOWAS), which had reacted to it with hostility.

Dramani was replaced as RPT Secretary-General by Solitoki Esso at the party's Ninth Ordinary Congress in December 2006. He remained a member of the RPT Political Bureau and a member of the RPT Central Committee from Tchamba Prefecture.

Dramani was the first candidate on the RPT's candidate list for Tchamba Prefecture in the October 2007 parliamentary election, and he was elected to the National Assembly. Following the election, he became President of the RPT Parliamentary Group.

In the July 2013 parliamentary election, Dramani was re-elected to the National Assembly as a candidate of the Union for the Republic (UNIR), a party created to replace the RPT as the ruling party, in Tchamba. When the National Assembly began meeting for its new term, Dramani was elected to succeed Bonfoh Abass as President of the National Assembly on 2 September 2013. Opposition deputies boycotted the vote because UNIR was unwilling to give them the posts of first and second vice-president in the Bureau of the National Assembly. Consequently, UNIR deputies were elected to all the posts in the Bureau.
