= Jimi Hope =

Togolese musician, painter, and sculptor (1956–2019)

- Born: October 12, 1956; Lomé
- Died: August 4, 2019 (aged 62)
- Occupations: Artist; Painter; Sculptor; Musician

Koffi Senaya (12 October 1956, Lomé – 5 August 2019, Paris), known professionally as Jimi Hope, was a Togolese musician, painter and sculptor. He first became known through the Acide Rock group.

== Albums ==
- Born to Love
- It's Too Late
- I Can't Take It
- Tôt ou Tard
