= Zio Prefecture =

Prefecture in the Maritime Region of Togo

Coordinates: 6.4333°N 1.2167°E

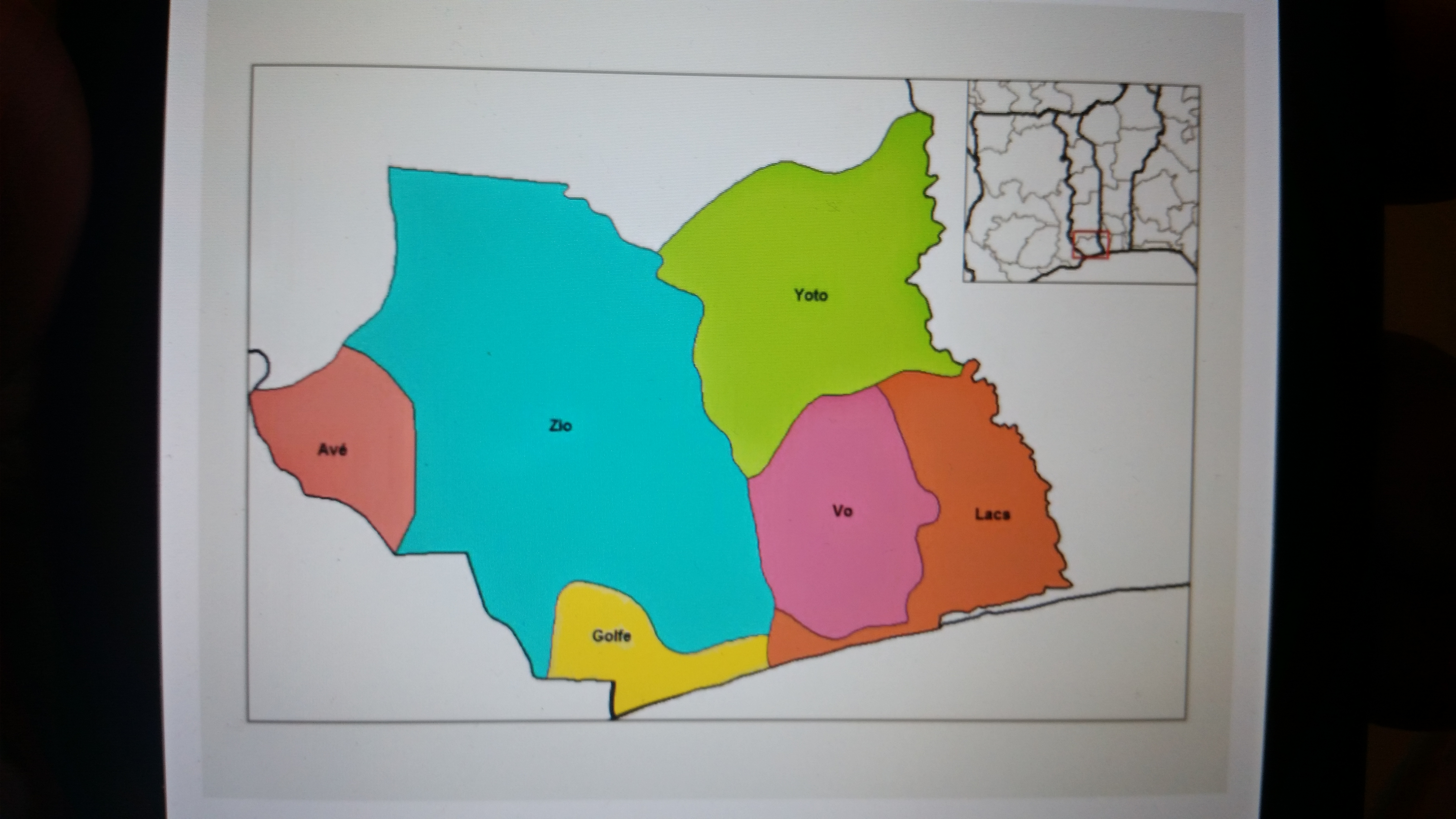
Map of Prefectures of the Maritime region of Togo.

Zio is a prefecture located in the Maritime Region of Togo. The prefecture covers 2,164 km^{2}, with a population in 2022 of 500,032. The prefecture seat is located in Tsévié.

Canton (administrative divisions) of Zio include Tsévié, Davié, Gblainvié, Dalavé, Kpomé, Gbatopé, Gapé-Centre, Bolou, Agbélouvé, Mission-Tové, Wli, Abobo, Kovié, Gamé-Sèva, Gapé-Kpodji, Djagblé, and Adétikopé .
