= Regions of Togo =

First-level administrative divisions of Togo

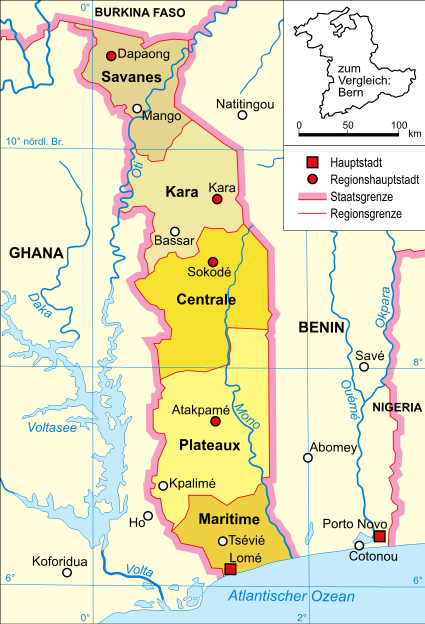
- Category: Unitary state
- Location: Togo
- Number: 5
- Populations: Smallest: Centrale, 617,871; Largest: Maritime, 2,599,955
- Areas: Smallest: Maritime, 6,100 km^{2} (2,355 sq mi); Largest: Plateaux, 16,975 km^{2} (6,554 sq mi)
- Government: Regional government
- Subdivisions: Prefecture

Regions (French: régions) are the first-level administrative divisions of Togo. They are subdivided into prefectures, which can be further broken down into communes. Each region has an elected regional government and a capital city that acts as its administrative seat. The regional governments have jurisdiction over some local affairs, but most powers are shared with the national government.

== Overview ==
Togo has five regions subdivided into 39 prefectures, which are in turn subdivided into 117 communes. The regions are, from north to south, Savanes, Kara, Centrale, Plateaux and Maritime. The Maritime Region, which contains the national capital Lomé, is the smallest by area but the largest by population, with over three-and-a-half million people. The Plateaux Region is the largest by area and accordingly has the most prefectures.

The five stripes of the flag of Togo represent the five regions.

=== List ===
| Region | Capital | Area (km^{2}) | Population (2022 census) | Prefectures |
|---|---|---|---|---|
| Centrale | Sokodé | 13,317 | 795,529 | 5 |
| Kara | Kara | 11,738 | 985,512 | 7 |
| Maritime | Tsévié | 6,100 | 3,534,991 | 8 |
| Plateaux | Atakpamé | 16,975 | 1,635,946 | 12 |
| Savanes | Dapaong | 8,470 | 1,143,520 | 7 |

== Governance ==
Regional governments were given more autonomy over local policies following national decentralisation reforms in 2021. They have sole jurisdiction over the construction and management of public spaces, such as bus stops, marketplaces, and urban green spaces; this category of power is officially known as "own abilities" (compétences propres). Responsibility is shared between the regional and national governments in regard to the construction and management of essential buildings and infrastructure, such as schools, nurseries, roads, and tolls; this is known as "shared abilities" (compétences partagées). Powers previously delegated to the national government that were transferred to the regional governments are known as "transferred abilities" (compétences transférées); these include the creation and management of public libraries and the hosting of cultural events.

== Constitutional protections ==
The Constitution of Togo forbids discrimination on the basis of one's regional origin. Additionally, political parties may not associate with a particular region, as this would contradict the national government's constitutional mandate to "defend national unity" and "achieve regional and subregional integration".

== Development ==
As of 2021, the northernmost Savanes Region had the lowest Human Development Index (HDI) with a score of 0.466, while the Centrale and Plateaux Regions had the highest with a tied score of 0.527 (Lomé was measured separately from the Maritime Region).

== Clickable map ==
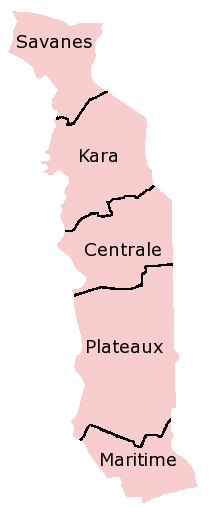
A clickable map of Togo exhibiting its five regions.

== See also ==
- ISO 3166-2:TG – Entry for Togo in ISO 3166-2
