= Dédé Rose Creppy =

Influential Togolese businesswoman and founding member of nanas benz

- Born: 22 December 1934
- Died: 5 June 2023 (aged 88)
- Occupation: Businesswoman
- Years active: 1960s–2010s
- Known for: Nana Benz

Dédé Rose Creppy, nicknamed Maman Creppy or Naan creppy, (22 December 1934 – 5 June 2023) was a Togolese businesswoman. She is considered the doyenne of the Nana Benz, a group of wealthy Togolese traders of Dutch pagne who were influential in the 1970s.

== Biography ==
=== Studies and childhood ===
Dédé Rose Creppy was born on 22 December 1934, or 1936 according to other sources, in Aného, a coastal town in Togo. Orphaned at the age of 9, she grew up with her maternal grandmother who introduced her to the pearl trade. She attended primary and secondary school at the girls' public school in Assivito and at the École des Étoiles. She continued her training at the National Teachers' School in Atakpamé where she obtained a teaching diploma.

=== Professional career ===
Dédé Rose Creppy began her professional activities as a bead seller before moving into selling Dutch pagne in the 1960s. For thirty years she was the president of the professional association of fabric sellers in Togo.

== Community life ==
She was the president of the professional association of fabric resellers (APRT), earning her the respect of the authorities.

== Awards and distinctions ==
- Officer of the Order of Mono
- Hoinyigan Prize
- Posthumous honorary award presented by Awunyo Awards

== Death ==
She died on 5 June 2023.
