= Maritime Region, Togo =

Region of Togo

Coordinates: 6°30′N 1°18′E

Maritime
- Region
- Maritime Region
- Country: Togo
- Capital: Tsévié

Area
  - Total: 6,100 km^{2} (2,400 sq mi)

Population (2022 census)
  - Total: 3,534,991
  - Density: 580/km^{2} (1,500/sq mi)
- HDI (2017): 0.532 low · 2nd

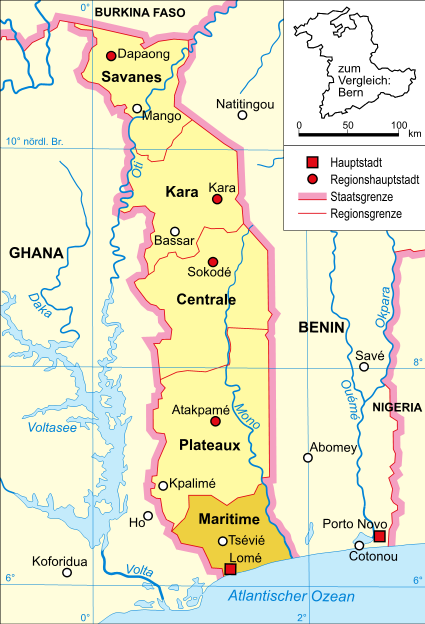
Maritime Region

Maritime Region (French: Région maritime) is the southernmost of Togo's five regions, with the country's only shoreline on the Bight of Benin. Tsévié serves as the regional capital. It is the smallest region in terms of area, but it has the largest population, with 3.5 million people.

Other major cities in the Maritime region include Lomé, the Capital of Togo, and Aného.

Maritime is located south of Plateaux Region. In the west, it borders the Volta Region of Ghana, and in the east it borders two departments of Benin: Kouffo further north, and Mono further south.

== Prefectures ==
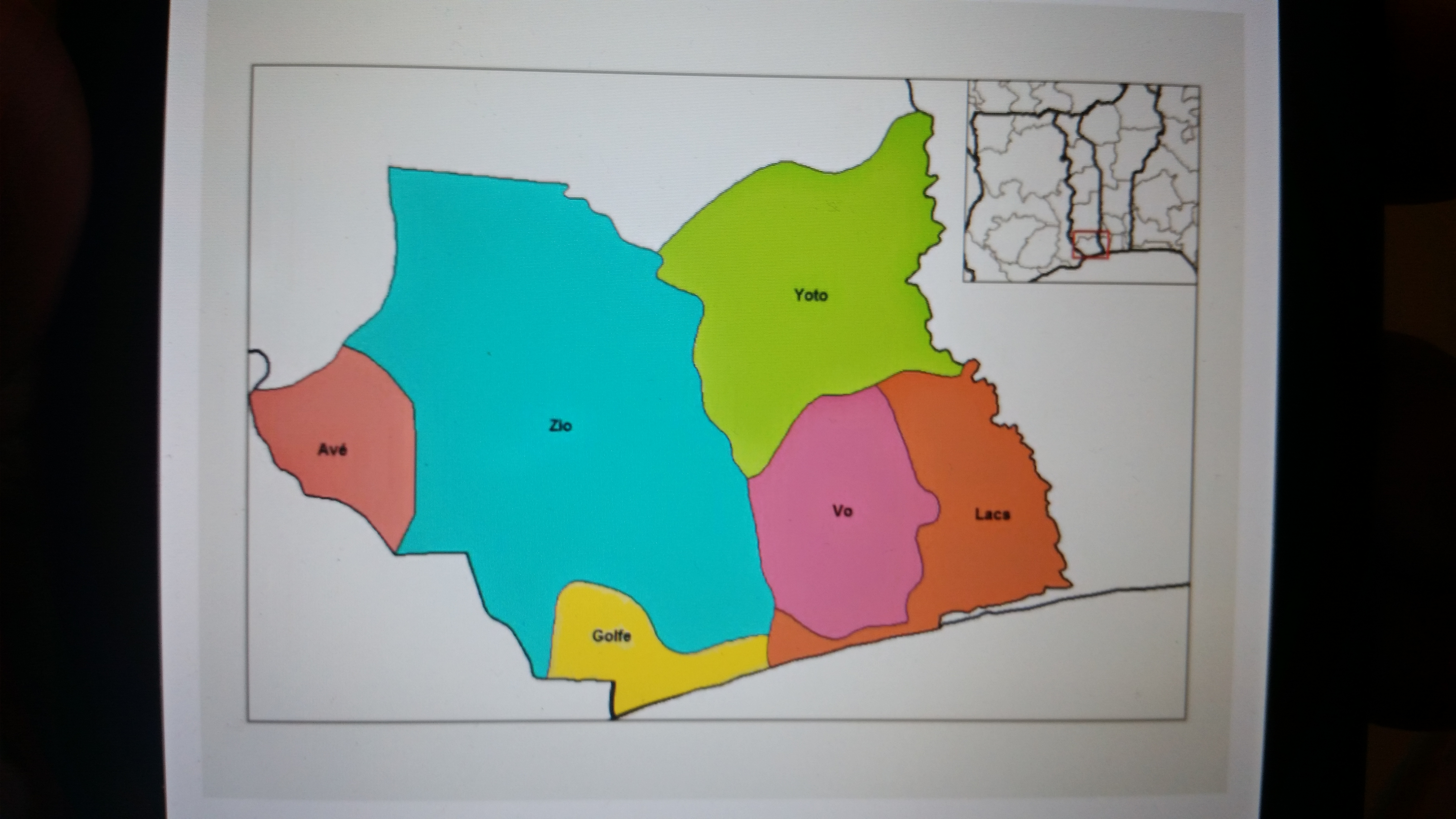
Map of Prefectures of the Maritime region of Togo.

Maritime is divided into the prefectures of Avé, Bas-Mono, Golfe, Lacs, Vo, Yoto, and Zio.
