= AISL =

AISL may refer to:

- Association Internationale Albert Schweitzer
- American Indoor Soccer League, a semi-professional indoor soccer league 2003-2008
- Argentina Improving Spanish Language
- American International School of Lagos
- American International School of Libreville
- American International School of Lomé
