= Lomé Grand Market =

Public market in Lomé, Togo

Coordinates: 6.1256261°N 1.2254183°E

- Grand marché de Lomé (French)
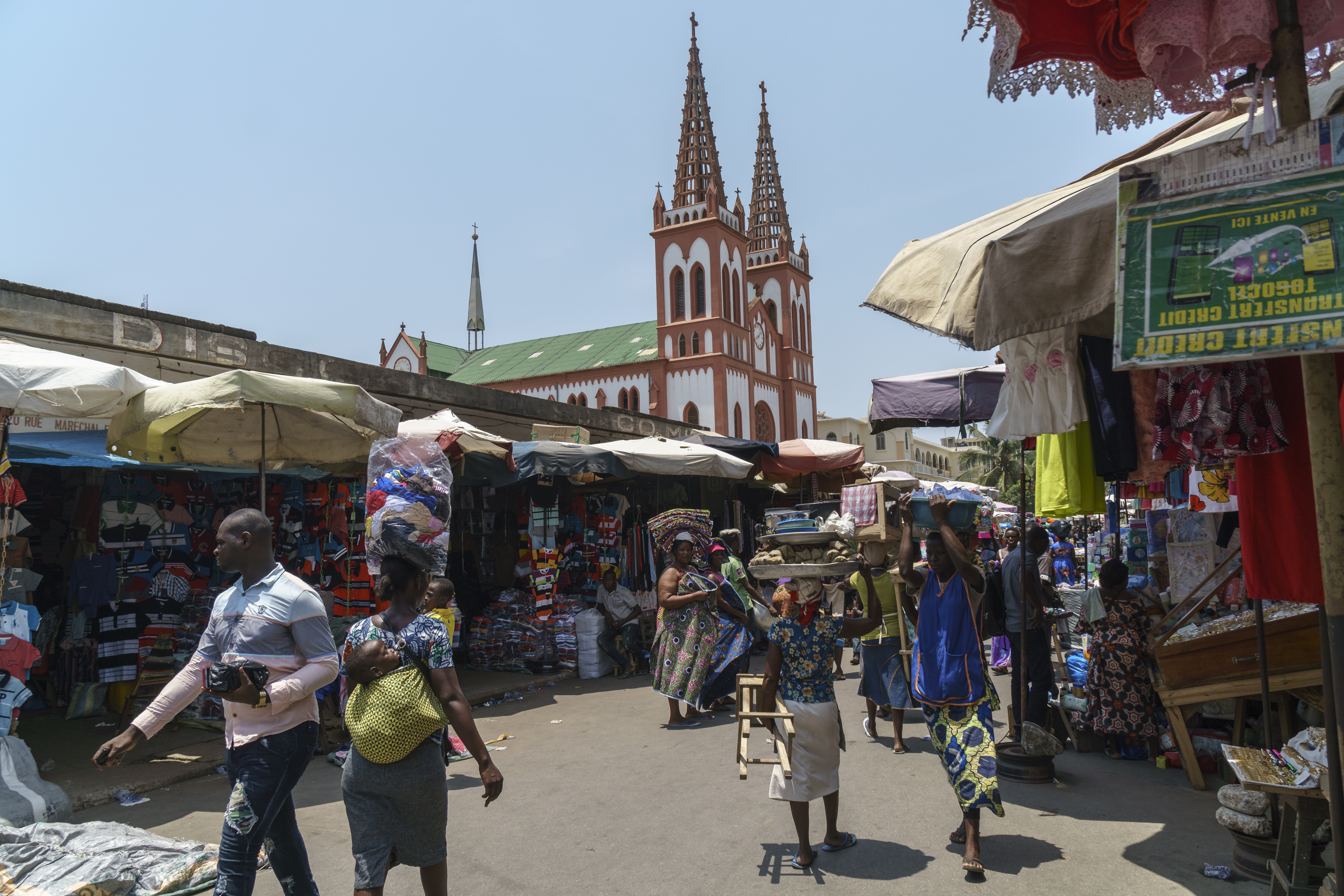
- The market in 2017. The Sacred Heart Cathedral is visible in the background.
- Interactive map of Lomé Grand Market
- Location: Lomé, Togo

The Lomé Grand Market (French: Grand marché de Lomé) is a public market in Lomé, the capital of Togo. It is located near the famous Sacred Heart Cathedral of Lomé, at the heart of the city. It occupies an entire city block and consists of three sections: Atipoji, Asigame and Assivito. Most vendors are women and children, and local performers can often be found playing live music at the market. A wide selection of spices are sold at the market, including cinnamon sticks, clove, nutmeg, and star anise.

In 2017, the Togolese government began an 18 million euro project to build a modern urban development at the market's location, tentatively titled Adawlato Grand Market, after the neighbourhood in which it will be located in.

== See also ==
- Nana Benz
