= Davide-Christelle Sanvee =

Swiss performance artist (1993-)

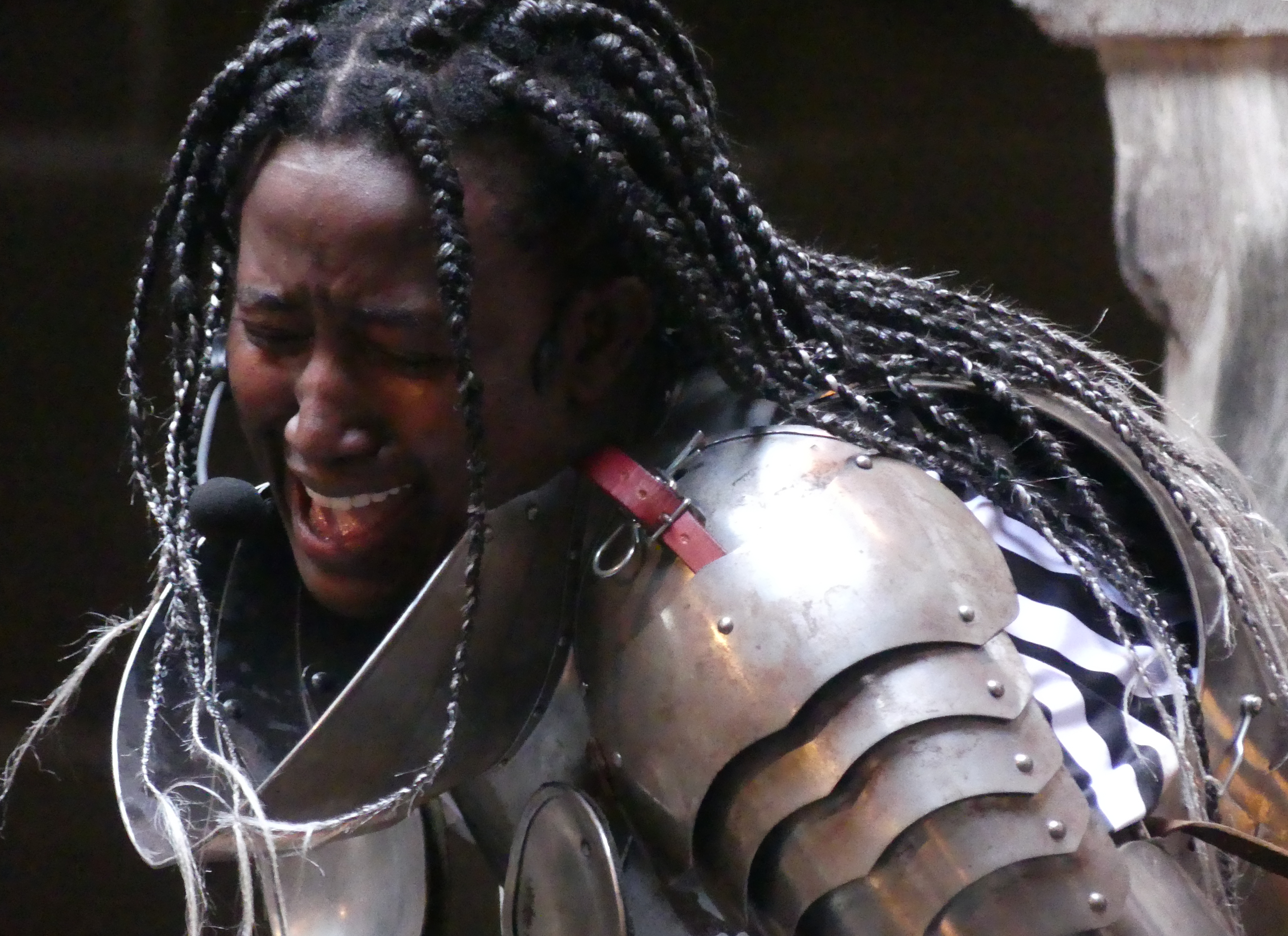
- At the 2021 Belluard Bollwerk Festival in Fribourg

Davide-Christelle Sanvee (1993, Lomé) is a Swiss artist of Togolese origin who works and lives between Geneva and Amsterdam. She is particularly known for her participatory performances, which regularly address socio-political issues. In 2019, she won the Swiss Performance Award.

== Education ==
From 2008 until 2016, Sanvee studied playing the clarinet at the Conservatoire populaire de musique (CPMDT), a music school in Geneva, Switzerland.

In 2013 she began her studies of visual arts at the Geneva University of Art and Design focusing on inclusive, political and social topics. In 2016 she recreated the Swiss naturalisation test and presented it to the academic jury during her final exam for graduation. Its members were mostly Swiss citizens but none of them passed the test and would not have obtained a Swiss passport.

In June 2019, Sanvee earned her master's degree at the Studio for Immediate Spaces of the Sandberg Institute in Amsterdam with the performance "Everything around, including you":

«The work integrates itself in the dailylife’s routine by using its social codes and existing architecture. Engaged with topics touching the relations between individuals and their positionality in public spaces, she proposes a scripted performance that assume its intention: to perturbate in order to requestion our behaviors. By initiating a situation where the street’s occupants have to negotiate with each others, she wants to challenge the expectations of her audience.»

Three months later, in September 2019, Sanvee was honoured with the Swiss Performance Award for her play Le ich dans nicht.

== Gallery ==
Être la forteresse at the Belluard Bollwerk Festival in Fribourg on 3 July 2021

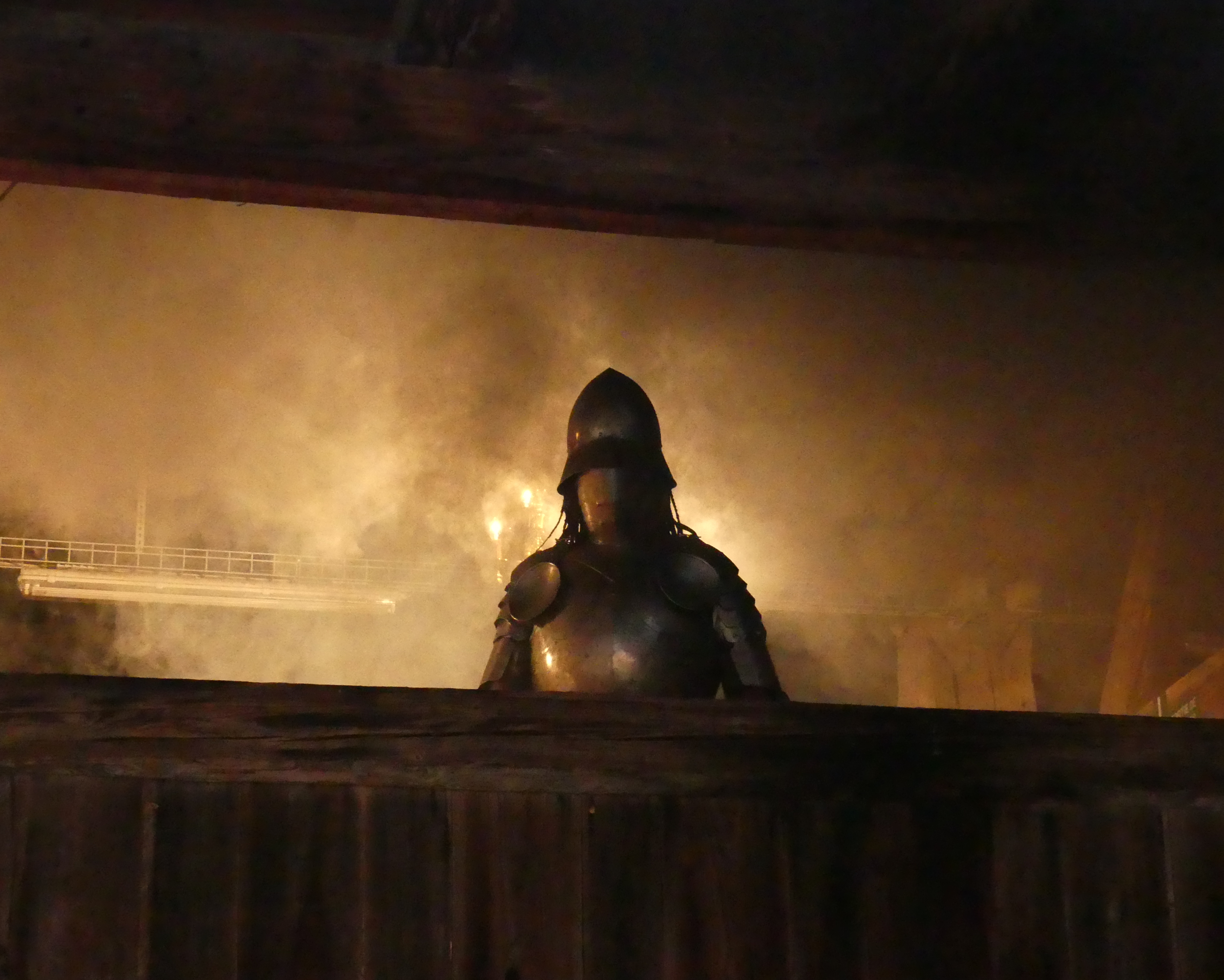

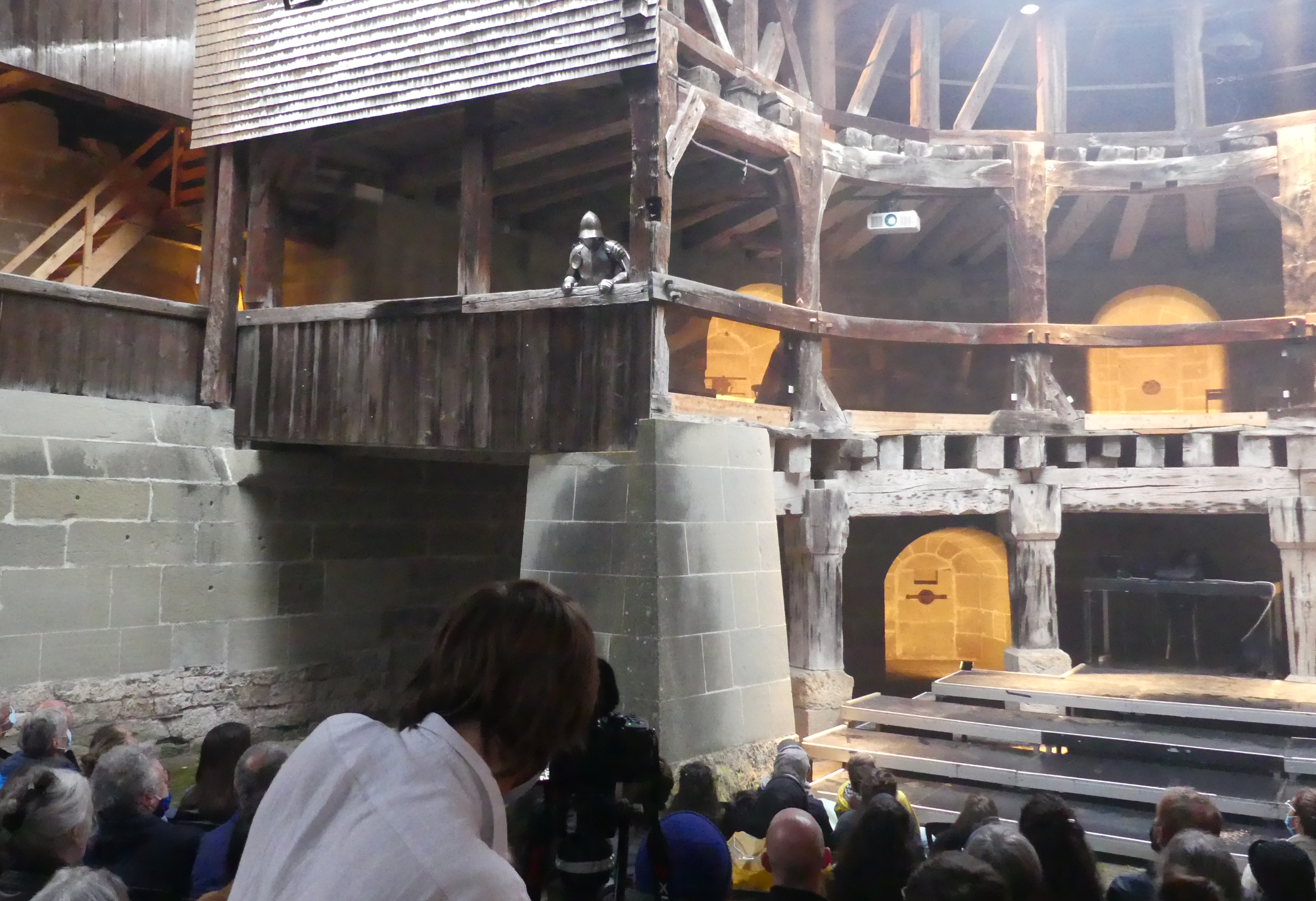

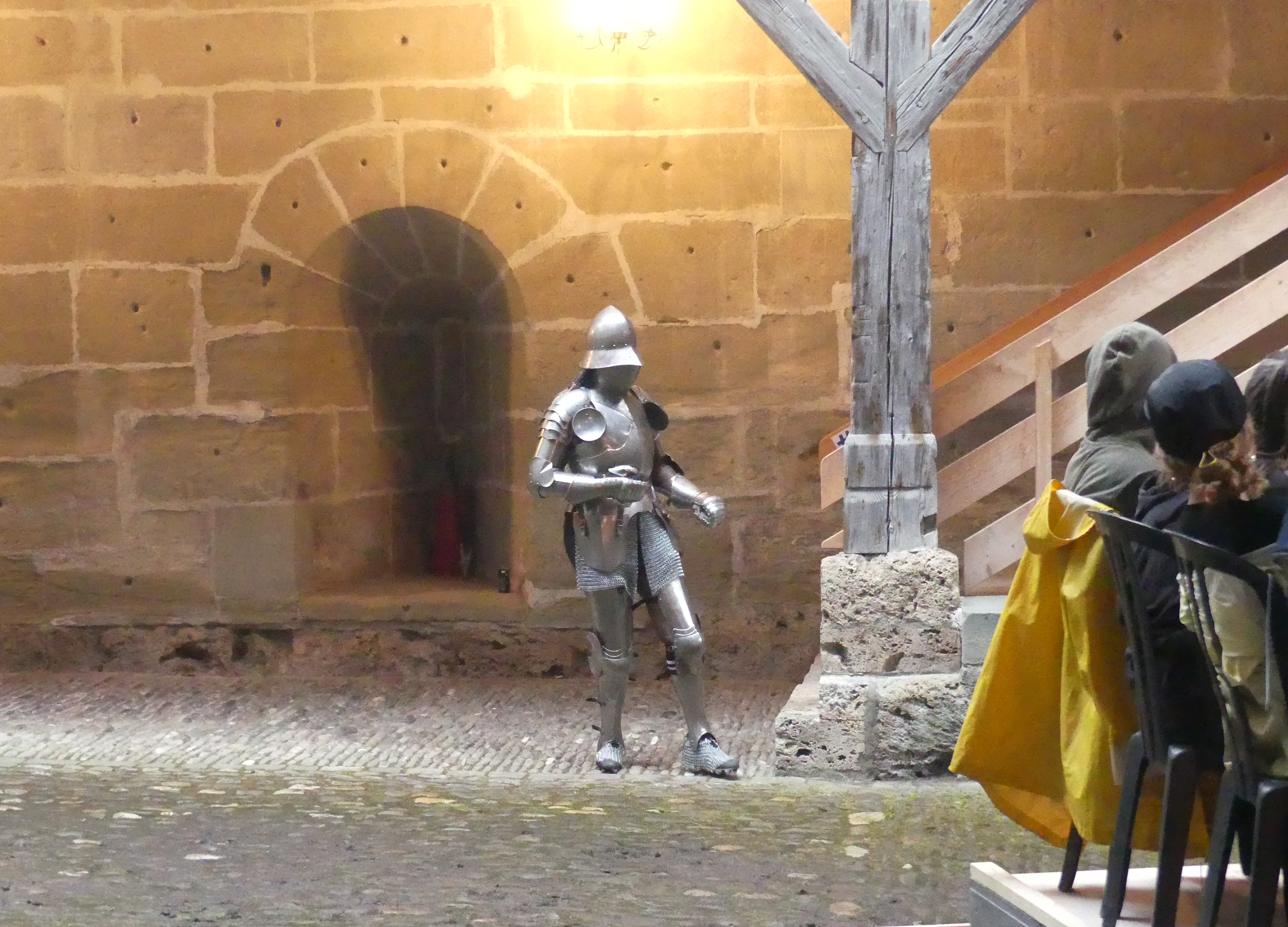

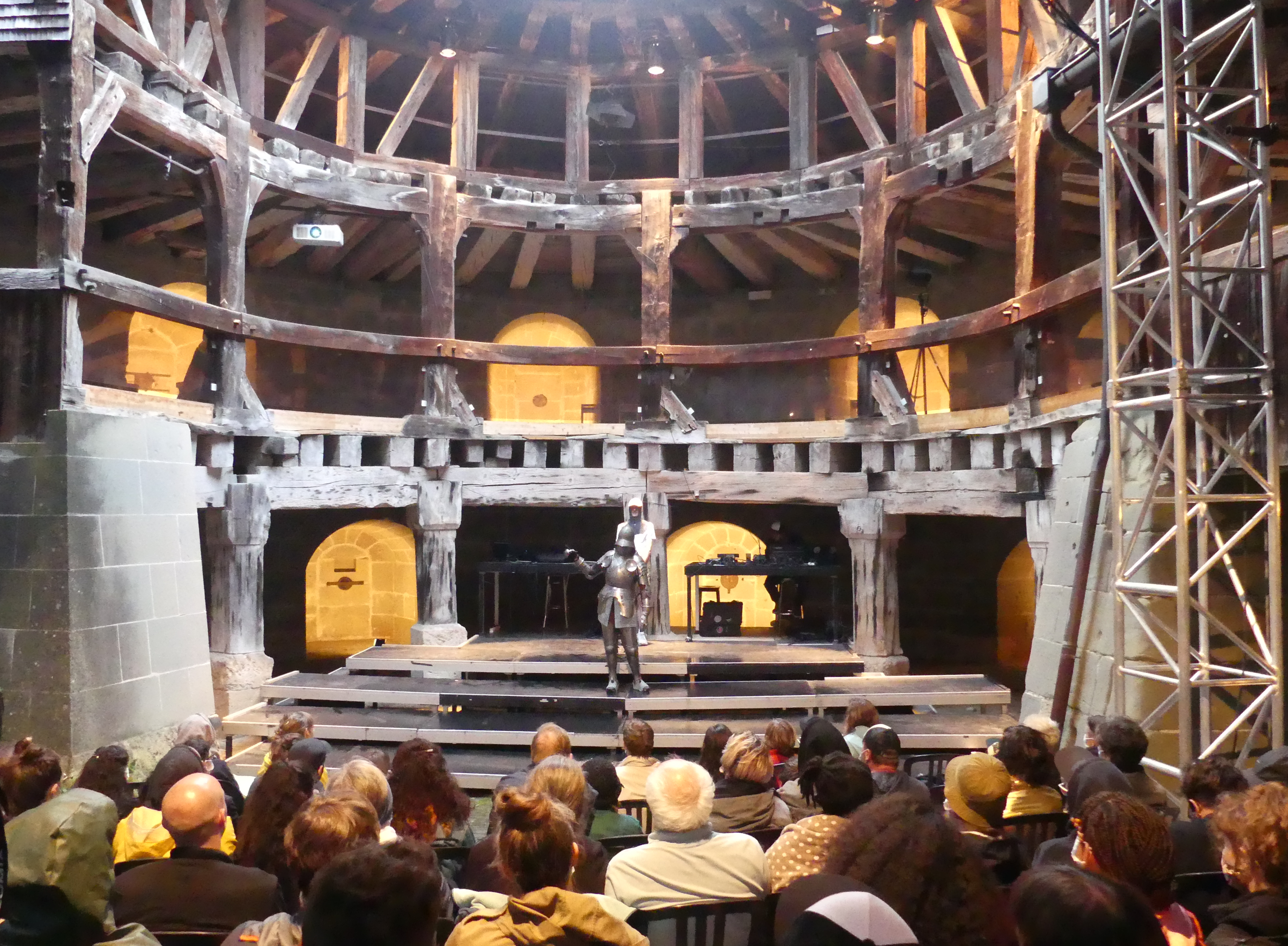

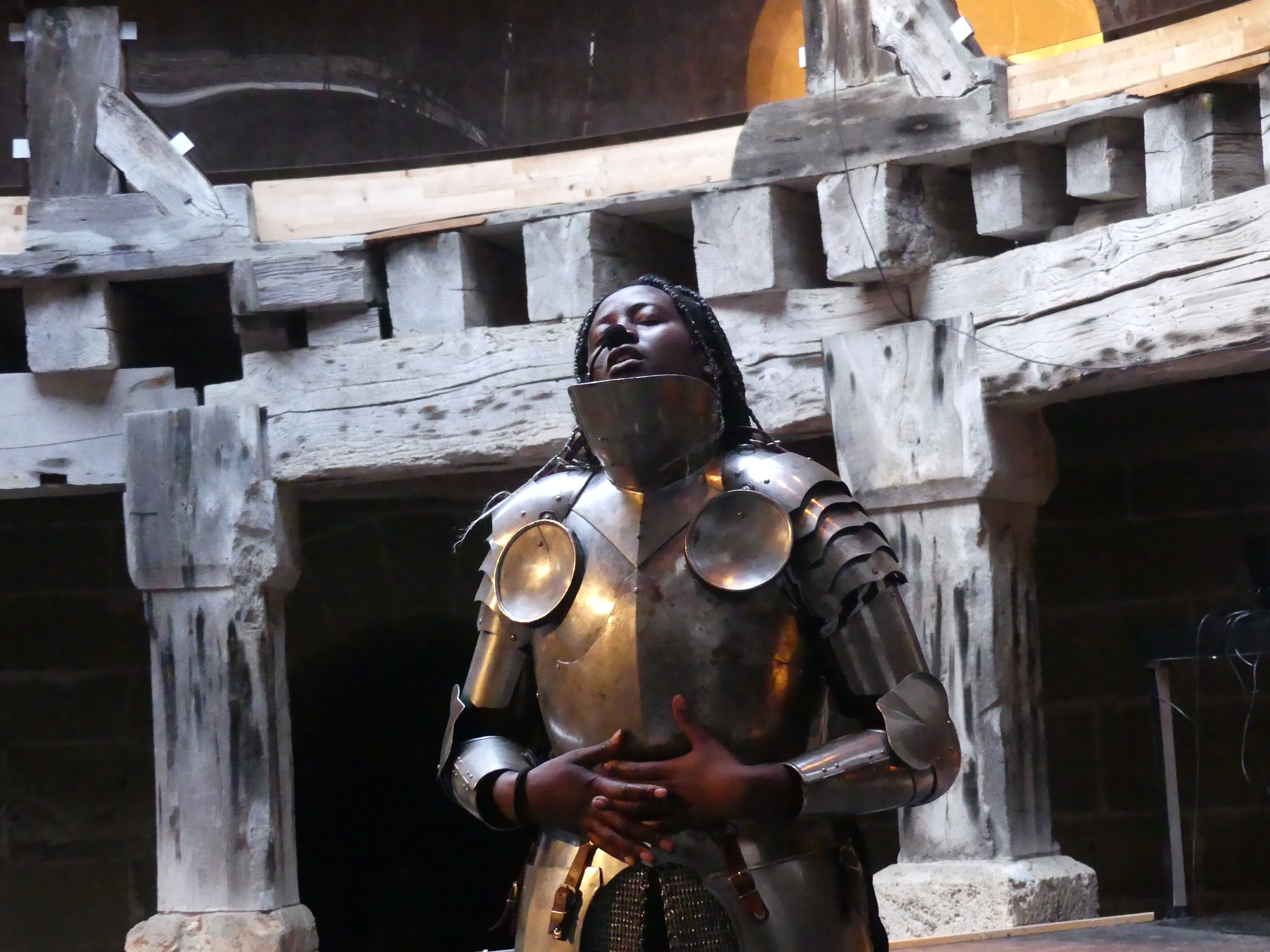
