= Yaovi Aziabou =

Togolese football (born 1990)

Personal information
- Date of birth: 11 September 1990 (age 36)
- Place of birth: Lomé, Togo
- Height: 1.77 m (5 ft 10 in)
- Position: Defender

Youth career
- 1999–2004: Planète Foot
- 2004–2007: Toulouse

Senior career*
Years	Team	Apps	(Gls)
2007–2009	Toulouse B	1	(0)
2010	JS Cugnaux	14	(1)
2010–2011	Tarbes	9	(0)
2011	Toulouse Fontaines Club	9	(0)
Total		33	(1)

International career
2007	Togo U-17	7	(0)
2010	Togo	1	(0)
- * Club domestic league appearances and goals

Yaovi Aziabou (born 11 September 1990) is a Togolese former professional footballer who played as a defender. He made one appearance for the Togo national team in 2010.

== Club career ==
Born in Lomé, Aziabou began his career with Planète Foot and in 2004 joined the youth team of FC Toulouse. On 4 January 2010, after two and a half years in the reserve team of Toulouse, he signed with French fifth-tier side Jeunesse Sportive Cugnalaise.

== International career ==
Aziabou earned his first call up for the Togo national team on 14 November 2008 and made his debut in the Corsica Cup on 21 May 2010 against Gabon.
