= Ablogamé =

Neighborhood of Lomé, Togo

Coordinates: 6°08′N 1°16′E

Ablogamé is a neighborhood of Lomé, Togo. A downtown area, it forms a district around the Port of Lomé.

== Economy ==
The neighborhood contains the Eglise des Assemblées de Dieu temple and Marché et Ambiance, a thriving market. Several hotels are also located here, including Hotel Mercure Sarakawa and Veronica Guesthouse.

In the mid-1980s, the DRDR organized vegetable growers meeting groups in the port area for the locals. In 1987, about 4,000 plots between 200 and 250 hectares, in the neighborhoods of Ablogamé and Akodessewa had a market value of 800 million CF.
