= Senam Langueh =

Togolese footballer

Personal information
- Date of birth: 23 February 1979 (age 47)
- Place of birth: Lomé, Togo
- Height: 1.76 m (5 ft 9 1/2 in)
- Position: Defender

Senior career*
Years	Team	Apps	(Gls)
1997–1998	ASKO Kara		
1998–2002	RCS Verviétois	88	(6)
2002–2004	Excelsior Virton	27	(0)
2004–2012	Union Royale Namur	103	(2)
2008–2009	→ Eupen (loan)	11	(0)
2009–2010	→ Walhain (loan)	11	(0)
2012–2013	Rochefort FC		
Total		269	(8)

International career
2003–2011	Togo	3	(0)
- * Club domestic league appearances and goals

Senam Langueh (born 23 February 1979) is a Togolese former international footballer who played as a defender.

== Career ==
Langueh has played club football in Togo, Belgium and France for ASKO Kara, RCS Verviétois, Excelsior Virton, Union Royale Namur, Eupen, Walhain and Rochefort FC.

He made his international debut for Togo in 2003.
