= Gnimdéwa Atakpama =

Togolese journalist, writer and teacher

- Born: April 19, 1977 (age 49); Lomé, Togo
- Occupations: Journalist, writer, French teacher
- Writing career
- Years active: 2003–present
- Genre: Children's literature
- Notable works: La désillusion (2003); Tolo-Tolo (2004); Sauve-souris ! (2011); Surtout n'entrez pas dans le sac ! (2012)

Gnimdéwa Atakpama (born 19 April 1977 in Lomé) is a Togolese journalist, writer and French teacher.

He has written four children's books as of 2015: La désillusion (2003), Tolo-Tolo (2004), Sauve-souris ! (2011) and Surtout n'entrez pas dans le sac ! (2012), the latter of which was translated into Italian in 2013. In his writing he often draws upon influences from his own childhood. In December 2007 he was the director of the International Storytelling Festival and Arts in Togo.
