= Patricia Dagban-Zonvide =

Togolese politician (born 1960)

Ayawavi Djigbodi Patricia Dagban-Zonvidé

Minister for the Promotion of Women
- In office July 2012 – September 2013

3rd Vice-President of the National Assembly of Togo
- Incumbent
- Assumed office April 2015

Personal details
- Born: March 17, 1960 (age 66) Lomé, Togo

Ayawavi Djigbodi Patricia Dagban-Zonvidé (born 17 March 1960 in Lomé) is a Togolese politician. Holder of a doctorate in African and comparative literature, Dagban-Zonvidé is Minister for the Promotion of Women in the government of Arthème Kwesi Séléagodji Ahoomey-Zunu.

Since 2013, she has been the third vice-president of the National Assembly of Togo.

== Career ==
Patricia Dagban-Zonvide was born on 17 March 1960 in Lomé, Togo and attended Tokoin High School. She has bachelor's and master's degrees in modern letters from the National University of Ivory Coast and a master's degree in tropical geography from the University of Benin. From 1982 she taught at the Moderne College in Dabou, Ivory Coast and the boys school in Bingerville. She returned to Togo after ten years abroad to teach in high schools and at the International Center for Research and Language Studies (CIREL). She studied for a doctorate in African and comparative literature from the University of Lomé and afterwards worked as an assistant professor of arts and humanities at the university. Dagban-Zonvide is married and has two children.

Dagban-Zonvide was appointed Minister for the Advancement of Women in July 2012 in Faure Gnassingbé's Union for the Republic government. She officially adopted the role on 1 August 2012, in a formal ceremony with outgoing minister Henriette Kouévi-Amédjogbé. Dagban-Zonvide topped the party list for Lomé for the July 2013 elections but was removed from the position of minister in September of that year. By April 2015 she was the 3rd Vice-President of the National Assembly.
