= Sacred Heart Cathedral, Lomé =

Coordinates: 6.125°N 1.226°E

Sacred Heart Cathedral
- Cathédrale du Sacré-Cœur de Lomé
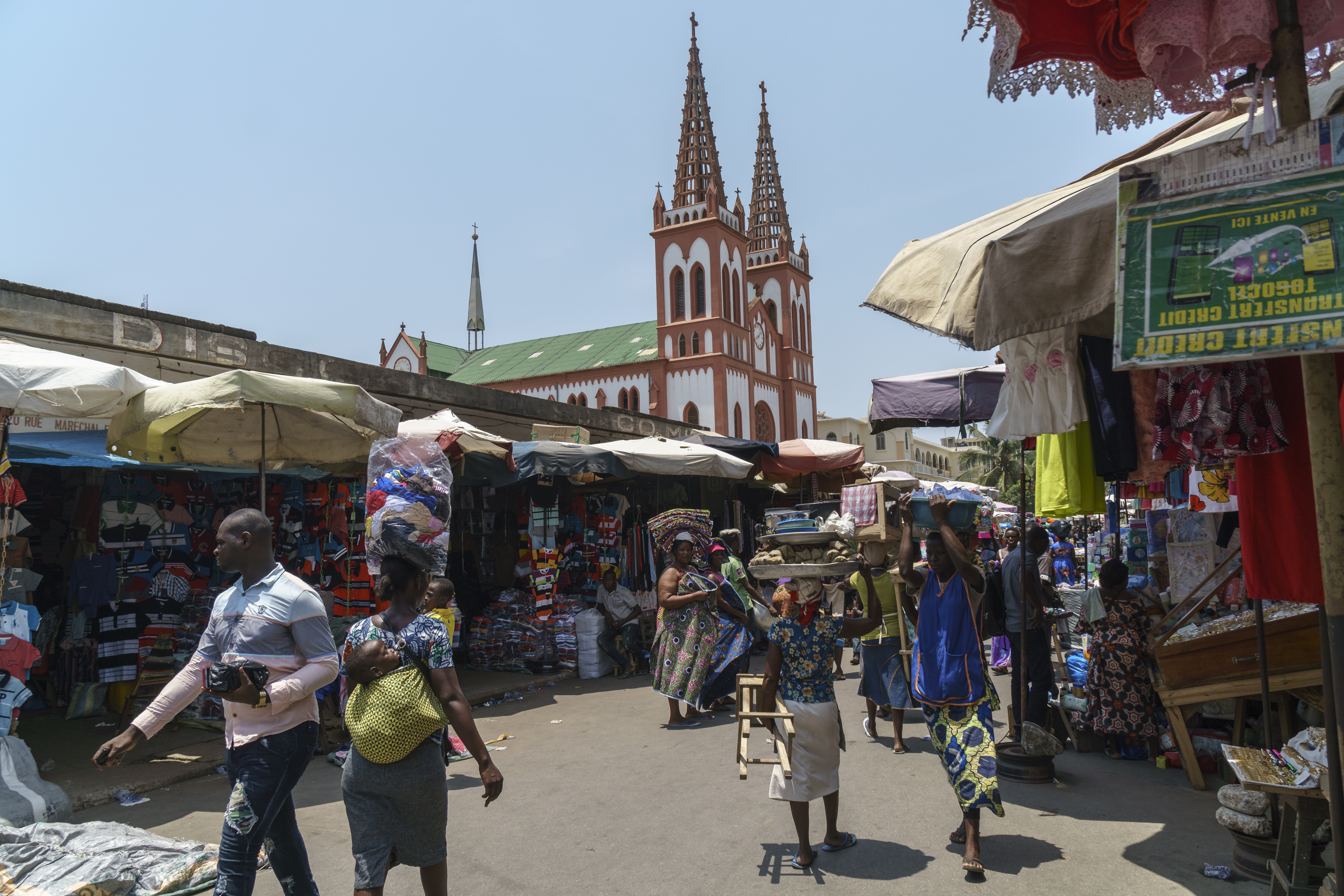
- Lomé Grand Market, with the cathedral in the background
- Sacred Heart Cathedral
- Location: Lomé
- Country: Togo
- Denomination: Roman Catholic Church

The Sacred Heart Cathedral (French: Cathédrale du Sacré-Cœur de Lomé) is the cathedral of the Roman Catholic Archdiocese of Lomé (since 14 September 1955), one of the seven Catholic church districts of Togo. Built in just over a year (April 1901 to September 1902) by the German colonial authorities, it quickly became one of the iconic buildings of the new capital of Togo.

== History ==
The first Catholic missionaries settled in Lomé in 1892. On 21 September 1902, in a solemn ceremony presided over by Bishop Albert, apostolic vicar of Côte-de-l'Or performed the consecration of the new sanctuary, which became a symbol the urbanization of Togo. On 9 August 1985, Pope John Paul II celebrated Mass in the cathedral.

== See also ==
- Roman Catholicism in Togo
