= American International School of Lomé =

The American International School of Lomé

Location
- Lomé; Togo
- Coordinates: 6.120517°N 1.207342°E

Information
- Type: Private
- Established: 1967
- School Director: Dr. Clover J. Afokpa
- Faculty: 9 full-time 7 part-time faculty (2013-2014 school year)
- Grades: K-12
- Enrollment: 100
- Telephone: (+228) 22 61 18 96
- Website: http://www.aislome.org

The American International School of Lomé (AISL) is a K-12 private coeducational day school in Kégué, a suburb north of Lomé, Togo which includes a pre-school (referred to as the Child Development Center).

== History ==
AISL was created in 1967 to meet the needs of Americans residing in Togo. Over the years the student population has changed and has become more international. When the school was first built, it was called the International School of Lome (ISL). (There was a sister school in Benin, a neighbor country. The second school was founded years after ISL and was known as the International School of Benin. The name of the school in Togo was later changed to show its dedication to an American curriculum: American International School of Lome or AISL.)

On June 4, 2012, the American International School of Lomé inaugurated a new building with a ribbon-cutting ceremony for parents, board members, teachers, staff, students, and those involved in the construction. The Togolese Minister of Education was the keynote speaker. U.S. Ambassador Whitehead also gave a speech. This was an important day for AISL after 45 years of continuous existence in Togo.

== Present day ==
Today, the school continues to provide an American-style education which will enable children to integrate easily, academically and socially, into American schools or international schools with similar requirements.

Graduating students are prepared for American colleges and universities.

Dr. Clover J. Afokpa is the director of the school. Mary Agnes Graves is the part-time administrator, college counselor and AP coordinator.

== Curriculum ==
The curriculum is similar to that of U.S. general academic and college preparatory schools. Most graduates attend colleges and universities throughout the world, primarily in the U.S. The school's testing programs include the SAT, PSAT, Plan, Explore, ACT and the MAPS. All classes are taught in English.

The elementary program, in which teachers are organized into grade-level teams, features specialists in science, art, computer studies, music, theater and physical education PE. The middle school, which includes sixth through eighth grades, uses interdisciplinary teams and a curriculum based on a block schedule. The high school, which offers many AP courses, is constantly re-evaluating its programs to better serve student needs and interests.

== Athletics and extracurricular activities ==
AISL offers a wide variety of activities and sports each school day from 2:15 to 5.00 p.m. Some activities and sports change each quarter. Those offered in the past include folk dance, additional French, batik, drama, drawing, needlework, ESL, SAT preparation and ceramics. Sports offered have included swimming, basketball, volleyball, handball, tennis.

Participation is encouraged and recommended as an extension of the academic school day. A minimum of one afternoon team sport activity is compulsory for grades 3–12.
