= Caritas Togo =

Catholic aid organisation in Togo

Charity Organisation for Integral Development – Caritas Togo
- Organisation de la charité pour un développement intégral – Caritas Togo

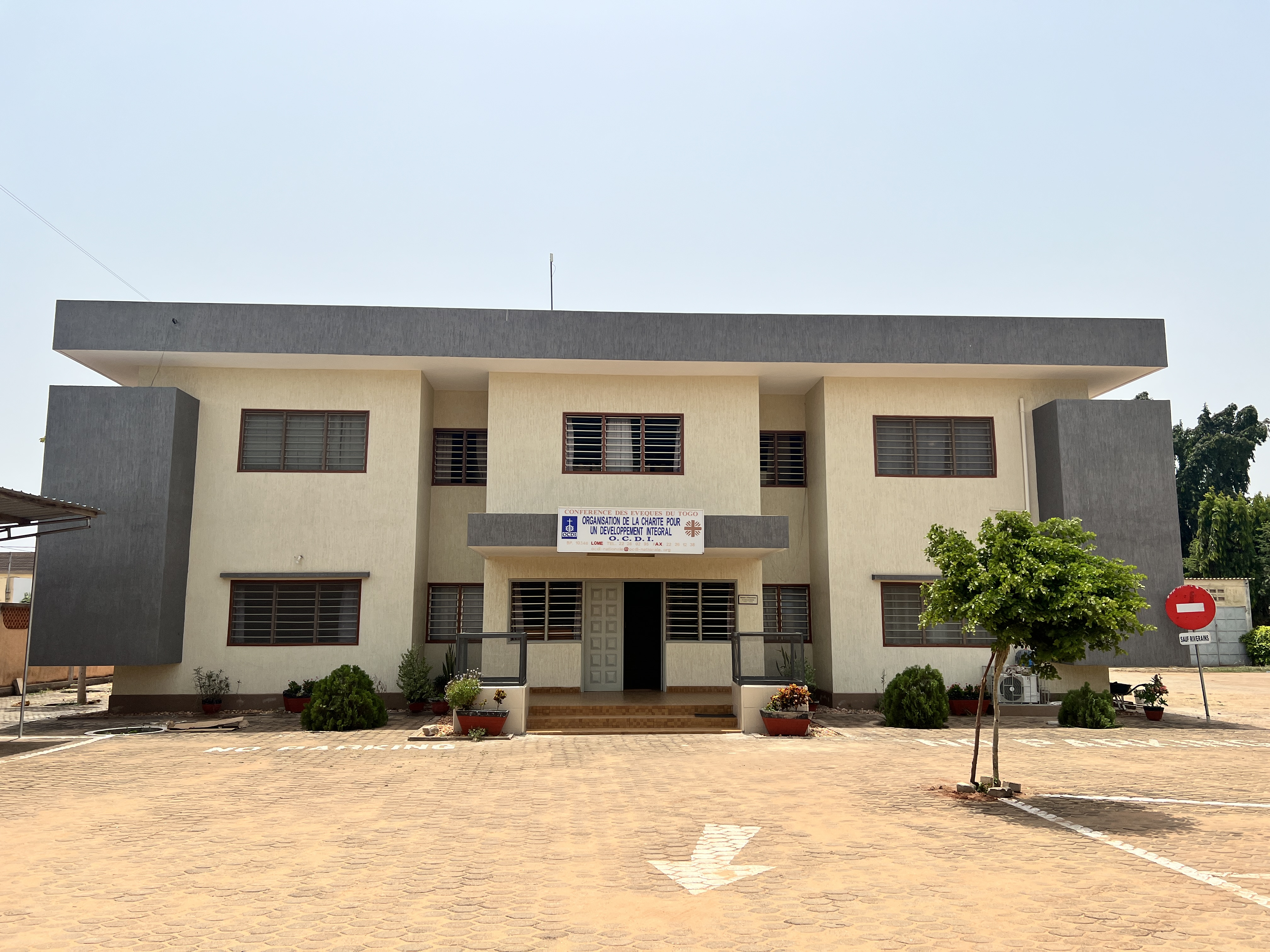
- National office in Lomé in 2024
- Abbreviation: OCDI
- Established: 1967
- Type: Nonprofit
- Purpose: social work, development, humanitarian relief
- Location(s): Lomé, Togo
- Coordinates: 6.1741°N 1.2389°E
- Origins: Catholic Social Teaching
- Region served: Togo
- Fields: social work, development aid, humanitarian aid
- President: Vacant
- Affiliations: Caritas Africa, Caritas Internationalis
- Budget: CFA 1,181,355,237 (2020)
- Website: ocdi-caritas-togo.tg

Caritas Togo, officially the Charity Organisation for Integral Development – Caritas Togo (French: Organisation de la charité pour un développement intégral – Caritas Togo) or simply OCDI Caritas Togo, is a Togolese nonprofit organisation established in 1967. It is the official aid organisation of the Catholic Church in Togo.

It is a member of the regional Caritas Africa network and of the worldwide Caritas Internationalis confederation.

== History ==
The organisation was created in 1967. It was then called Caritas Togolaise and was responsible for the charitable work of the Church. It coexisted with another Catholic organisation, the Bureau de coordination pour le développement (Development Coordination Office), which was responsible for community development projects.

In July 1987, on the initiative of the Episcopal Conference of Togo, the two organisations merged to become the Organisation of Charity for Integral Development (OCDI), keeping the suffix Caritas Togo. It is a legal person under canon law and is governed by the civil legislation in force in Togo.

== Structure ==
The organisation is active throughout the country through its network of seven diocesan organisations of the same name and a national coordination structure, based in Lomé. In January 2016, more than 223 parish branches were created.

The national coordination structure consists of three entities: the national office, i.e. the headquarters, the Pharmaceutical Supply Centre of the Catholic Church of Togo (Note: in French: Centre d'approvisionnement pharmaceutique de l'Église catholique du Togo) (OCDI-CAPHECTO), which is the delocalised health branch of the organisation and whose mission is the procurement and distribution of generic drugs at lower cost to Catholic dispensaries, and the Visitor Centre Marie–Marthe (Note: in French: Centre d'Accueil Marie & Marthe) (OCDI-CA2M), located in the same complex as the national office and which is a centre with meeting rooms and guest rooms, run with the purpose of generating income for the organisation.

The seven diocesan organisations are:

- OCDI Caritas Aného
- OCDI Caritas Atakpamé
- OCDI Caritas Dapaong
- OCDI Caritas Kara
- OCDI Caritas Kpalimé
- OCDI Caritas Lomé
- OCDI Caritas Sokodé

The supreme body of the OCDI Caritas Togo network is the Episcopal Conference of Togo, even before the General Assembly which is made up of all the diocesan Caritas and is convened every three years, and the board of directors. The chairman of the board of directors was Nicodème Barrigah-Bénissan, the Archbishop of Lomé, until his death in August 2024.

== Mission and work ==
OCDI/Caritas Togo is the social arm of the Catholic Church in Togo. Its mission is to "accompany, support and raise the awareness of communities in the identification and analysis of their problems and capacities with a view to seeking ways and means likely to lead to the improvement of their living conditions", as well as organising Christian charity and helping Christians to "incarnate the charity of Christ in their lives". Despite its Christian identity, OCDI states that it supports all people in need, regardless of religious affiliation or other discrimination.

The priority areas of the Strategic Plan 2020–2024 of OCDI Caritas Togo are food security; community health; community finance; water, hygiene and sanitation; and informal, citizenship, peace and environmental education. This work is implemented with the support of partners such as the Togolese state (providing 45% of the funds in 2020), numerous Caritas sister organisations and other international NGOs (46%). To this can be added the funds raised by the OCDI network (9%). The organisation's budget amounted to CFA 1,181,355,237 in 2020.

OCDI Caritas-Togo implements social aid programmes aimed at the most vulnerable people, including orphans and people with HIV/AIDS, as well as development and humanitarian projects, for example by supporting people affected by floods or other natural disasters.
