= List of Catholic dioceses in Togo =

The Roman Catholic Church in Togo is composed of 1 ecclesiastical province and 6 suffragan dioceses.

== List of dioceses ==
=== Episcopal Conference of Togo ===
==== Ecclesiastical Province of Lomé ====
- Archdiocese of Lomé
  - Diocese of Aného
  - Diocese of Atakpamé
  - Diocese of Dapaong
  - Diocese of Kara
  - Diocese of Kpalimé
  - Diocese of Sokodé
