= Nicodème Barrigah-Benissan =

Togolese Roman Catholic archbbishop (1963–2024)

- Archbishop of Lomé
- Archdiocese: Lomé
- Elected: 23 November 2019
- Term ended: 4 August 2024
- Predecessor: Denis Komivi Amuzu-Dzakpah
- Previous post: Bishop of Atakpamé (2008–2019)

Personal details
- Born: Nicodème Yves Anani Barrigah-Benissan; 19 May 1963 Ouagadougou, Republic of Upper Volta
- Died: 4 August 2024 (aged 61) Lomé, Togo
- Denomination: Roman Catholicism
- Motto: Beati pacifici
- Coat of arms

Styles of Nicodème Barrigah-Benissan
- Reference style: His Excellency; The Most Reverend
- Spoken style: Your Excellency
- Religious style: Archbishop

Nicodème Barrigah-Benissan or simply Nicodème Barrigah (19 May 1963 – 4 August 2024) was a Togolese prelate of the Catholic Church. He was Archbishop of Lomé from 2019 to 2024. In addition to his episcopal ministry, he was known for his musical and dramatic career, and was awarded the Grand Prize for Togolese Literature in 2020 for the play Le Trône royal.

Barrigah-Benissan was also President of OCDI Caritas Togo, the official charity organisation of the Catholic Church in Togo.

== Ecclesiastical career ==
=== Youth and education ===
Nicodème Yves Anani Barrigah-Benissan was born into a Togolese family in Ouagadougou, Upper Volta, in 1963. His family returned to Togo some years after his birth and he completed his primary education and minor seminary in the Nyékonakpoé district of Lomé. He then studied philosophy and theology in the Saint-Gall Major Seminary in Ouidah in neighbouring Benin.

=== Ordination and first missions ===
Barrigah-Benissan was ordained a priest on 8 August 1987 in the Our Lady of the Trinity Cathedral in Atakpamé, where he spent his first year as vicar of the cathedral parish. He was sent to study dogmatic theology at the Catholic Institute of Abidjan from 1988 to 1990, then exegesis at the Biblicum in Rome between 1990 and 1993, and finally canon law from 1993 to 1997 at the Pontifical Urban University and diplomacy at the Pontifical Academy.

From 1997, he was employed by the diplomatic service of the Holy See, and was sent to several successive nunciatures. His first mission was to Rwanda from 1997 to 2000, where he helped manage the judicial aftermath of the genocide, in particular the trial of a bishop. He was then sent to El Salvador (2000–2003), followed by Côte d'Ivoire (2003–2007), where he was present during the political and military crisis. He was then sent to Israel from March 2007 to March 2008.

=== Bishop of Atakpamé ===
On 9 March 2008, Barrigah-Benissan was ordained Bishop of the Diocese of Atakpamé. Within the Bishops' Conference of Togo, he became the chairman of the Truth, Justice and Reconciliation Commission in 2009, tasked with shedding light on the political violence in Togo, from 1958 until the 2005 Togo protests and riots. The conclusions of this enquiry were presented to President Faure Gnassingbé in April 2012.

=== Archbishop of Lomé ===
On 23 November 2019, Barrigah-Benissan was appointed Archbishop of Lomé to succeed Denis Komivi Amuzu-Dzakpah, who resigned because of age.

Before the 2020 Togolese presidential election, he worked in particular to ensure that candidates see politics as a "service that promotes social friendship to generate the common good" and their opponents "as brothers and sisters with other visions of development for the country". After Faure Gnassingbé's re-election, a result contested in particular by Agbéyomé Kodjo and Archbishop Emeritus Philippe Kpodzro, Nicodème Barrigah-Benissan worked to appease both sides and challenged the blockages imposed by the Presidency.

His role as mediator was criticised by his predecessor Philippe Kpodzro in an open letter published on 21 January 2021. The archbishop emeritus, who called him his "favourite son whom I begot with so much love", also criticised him for "shirking [his] responsibilities [... and] putting the church back under the boots of the bloodthirsty dictatorship".

== Artistic career ==
=== Musician ===
During his mission at the nunciature in Côte d'Ivoire, Barrigah-Benissan produced his first album of religious songs, entitled Père pardonne-nous ("Father forgive us"). He wrote and composed the texts and music for hundreds of songs, which were brought together on several albums. Most of his compositions were religious, but some were secular. He performed regularly in concert, singing and playing guitar.

=== Playwright and author ===
Barrigah-Benissan was also a playwright. In 1993, he wrote a play entitled Le Trône royal, in which he evoked certain African traditions, as well as the place of the female figure and predestination. The play, reissued in 2019, was awarded the Grand Prize for Togolese Literature in 2020.

In 2022, he published a book Crise d'autorité, abus de pouvoir ("Crisis of authority, abuse of power").

== Death ==
Barrigah-Benissan died on 4 August 2024, at the age of 61.

Catholic Church titles
Preceded by Denis Komivi Amuzu-Dzakpah	Archbishop of Lomé; 23 November 2019 – 4 August 2024	Succeeded by Vacant
Preceded by Julien Mawule Kouto	Bishop of Atakpamé; 9 March 2008 – 23 November 2019	Succeeded by Moïse Messan Touho
