= Saint-Joseph College of Lomé =

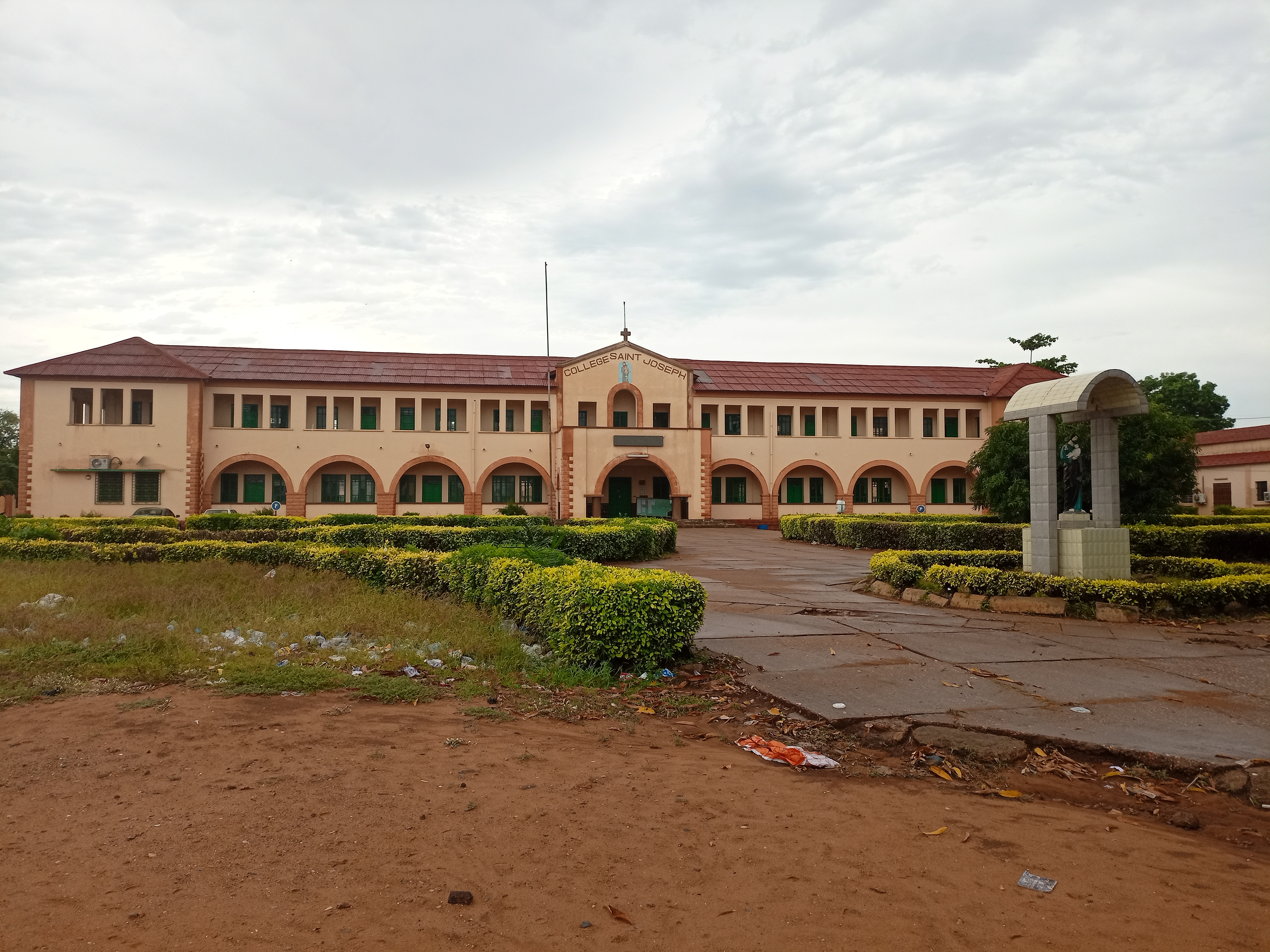
- Courtyard of Collège Saint-Joseph de Lomé

Location
- 243, Boulevard de la Paix, Tokoin N'Kafu, Lomé; Lomé, BP:63; Togo
- Coordinates: 6°09′01″N 1°13′58″E

Information
- Type: Public secondary school
- Established: 1948
- Language: French, English, Spanish, German

The Saint-Joseph College of Lomé is a general education institution located in the N'Kafu district, Golfe 2 municipality, City of Lomé, Togo.

== History ==
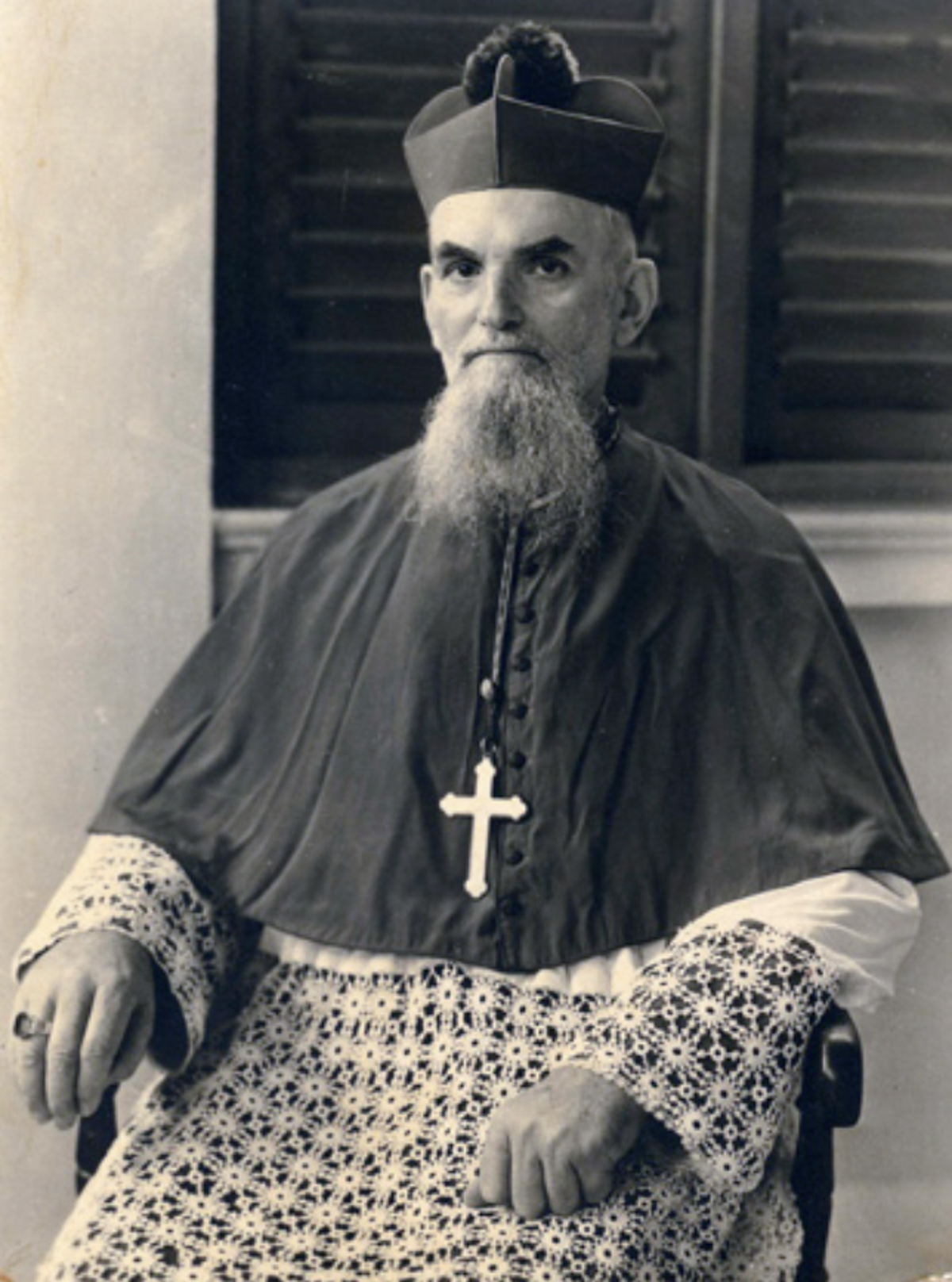
Monseigneur Joseph Strebler

Collège Saint-Joseph de Lomé was founded by Bishop Joseph Strebler in 1948. On 15 March 2008, the college celebrated its 60th anniversary. The construction of the building was completed in 1950. Officially, the college was inaugurated by Governor Diogo on 22 October 1950. Boys and girls were separated for classes at that time. It wasn't until 1977 that this school became co-educational at the request of the Togolese government.

== Education ==
At Collège Saint-Joseph de Lomé, students receive a general education leading to the baccalauréat qualification in force in Togo.

== Admission ==
Admission is through registration with documents requested by the institution.

- Jean-Pierre Fabre
- Denis Komivi Amuzu-Dzakpah
- Atsutsè Kokouvi Agbobli
