= Celestin-Marie Gaoua =

Togolese Roman Catholic prelate (born 1957)

Célestin-Marie Gaoua
- Bishop of Sokodé
- Church: Catholic Church
- Diocese: Diocese of Sokodé
- Appointed: 3 January 2016
- Predecessor: Ambroise Kotamba Djoliba

Orders
- Ordination: 27 December 1986
- Consecration: 5 March 2016 by Brian Udaigwe

Personal details
- Born: 6 April 1957 (age 69) Wahala (north of Notsé), Togoland under French administration, French West Africa, French Empire

Célestin-Marie Gaoua (born 6 April 1957) is a Togolese Catholic prelate.

== Life and work ==
Gaoua was born 6 April 1957 in Wahala, Haho prefecture. On December 27, 1986, he was ordained a priest for the Diocese of Atakpamé by Philippe Fanoko Kossi Kpodzro. The latter appointed him rector of the foyer of the Saint-Paul d'Atakpamé minor seminary, then in 1991 of the Père-Jérémie-Moran d'Atakpamémiddle seminary. He resumed his studies in 1994, being sent to France to the Faculty of Catholic Theology in Strasbourg. In 2000, he was sent as priest Fidei donum to the diocese of Sokodé where he assumed the position of rector of the cathedral, but also between 2005 and 2007 administrator of the parish of Notre-Dame de la Visitation in Kulundé. In 2009, he was appointed rector of the seminary of Tchichao, in the diocese of Kara.

Pope Francis appointed him fourth bishop of the Diocese of Sokodé on 3 January 2016, succeeding Ambroise Kotamba Djoliba.

Catholic Church titles
Preceded by Ambroise Kotamba Djoliba	Bishop of Sokodé; 2016–	Succeeded by current
