= Episcopal Conference of Togo =

Assembly of Catholic bishops

- Conférence épiscopale du Togo
- logo
- Location: Lomé, Togo
- Region served: West Africa
- President: Benoît Comlan Messan Alowonou
- Vice-President: Denis Komivi Amuzu-Dzakpah
- General Secretary: Émile Segbedji
- Affiliations: Catholic Church

The Episcopal Conference of Togo (French: Conférence épiscopal du Togo or Conférence des évêques du Togo, CET) is the episcopal conference of the Catholic Church in Togo.

The CET is a member of the Regional Bishops' Conference of Francophone West Africa and Symposium of Episcopal Conferences of Africa and Madagascar (SECAM).

List of presidents:

- 1970–1992: Robert-Casimir Tonyui Messan Dosseh-Anyron, Archbishop of Lomé
- 1992–2006: Philippe Fanoko Kossi Kpodzro, Archbishop of Lomé
- 2006–2012: Ambrose Kotamba Djoliba, bishop of Sokodé
- 2012–present: Benoît Comlan Messan Alowonou. bishop of the Diocese of Kpalimé

The official aid organisation of the Togolese Bishops Conference is OCDI Caritas Togo.
