= Cathedral of Saints Peter and Paul =

Cathedral of Saints Peter and Paul may refer to:

== Africa ==
- Sts. Peter and Paul Cathedral, Parakou, Borgou Department, Benin
- Cathedral of Saints Peter and Paul, Douala, Littoral Region, Cameroon
- Sts. Peter and Paul Cathedral, Lubumbashi, Haut-Katanga Province, Democratic Republic of the Congo
- St. Peter and St. Paul Cathedral, Abeokuta, Ogun State, Nigeria
- Saint Peter and Paul Cathedral, Kara, Togo

== Americas ==
- Saint Peter and Paul Cathedral, Paramaribo, Suriname
- Saints Peter and Paul Cathedral (Indianapolis), Indiana, United States
- Cathedral Basilica of Saints Peter and Paul (Philadelphia), Pennsylvania, United States
- Cathedral of Saints Peter and Paul, Providence, Rhode Island, United States
- Cathedral Church of Saint Peter and Saint Paul, Washington, D.C., United States
- Saints Peter and Paul Cathedral (St. Thomas, U.S. Virgin Islands)
- St. Peter and St. Paul Cathedral, Maracaibo, Zulia, Venezuela

== Asia ==
- Peter and Paul Cathedral Baoding, China
- St. Peter and St. Paul Cathedral, Nagoya, Japan
- Saints Peter and Paul Cathedral (Ulaanbaatar), Mongolia
- Cathedral of Sts. Peter and Paul, Faisalabad, Punjab, Pakistan
- Saints Peter and Paul Cathedral (Calbayog), Philippines
- Saints Peter and Paul Cathedral (Sorsogon), Philippines

== Australia ==
- St Peter and Paul's Old Cathedral, Goulburn, New South Wales
- St Peter and St Paul Russian Orthodox Cathedral, Sydney, New South Wales
- Ss Peter and Paul Cathedral, Port Pirie, South Australia
- Sts. Peter and Paul Cathedral, Melbourne, Victoria

== Europe ==
- Peter and Paul Cathedral (Gomel), Belarus
- Cathedral of St. Peter and St. Paul in Đakovo, Slavonia, Croatia
- Osijek Co-cathedral, Slavonia, Croatia
- Saint Peter and Paul Cathedral, Karlovy Vary, Czech Republic
- Cathedral of St. Peter and Paul, Brno, Czech Republic
- St Peter and St Paul's Cathedral, Tallinn, Estonia
- Cathedral of St. Peter and St. Paul, Nantes, Pays de la Loire, France
- Cathedrale Saint-Pierre-et-Saint-Paul de Troyes, Champagne, France
- St. Peter and Paul Cathedral, Brandenburg, Germany
- Basilica of Sts. Peter and Paul, Dillingen, Germany
- Klagenfurt Cathedral, Germany
- Naumburg Cathedral, Germany
- Sts. Peter and Paul Cathedral, Pécs, Baranya, Hungary
- Cathedral of Saint Peter and Saint Paul, Ennis, County Clare, Ireland
- Cathedral Basilica of Saints Peter and Paul, Kaunas, Lithuania
- Cathedral of Saints Peter and Paul, Šiauliai, Lithuania
- Sts. Peter and Paul Cathedral, Gliwice, Silesian Voivodeship, Poland
- Archcathedral Basilica of St. Peter and St. Paul, Poznań, Greater Poland Voivodeship, Poland
- Cathedral of Saints Peter and Paul, Constanța, Romania
- Cathedral of Sts. Peter and Paul, Chortkiv, Ternopil Oblast, Ukraine
- Sts. Peter and Paul Cathedral, Kamianets-Podilskyi, Khmelnytskyi Oblast, Ukraine
- Saint Peter and Paul Cathedral, Lutsk, Volyn Oblast, Ukraine
- Cathedral Church of SS. Peter and Paul, Clifton, Bristol, England, United Kingdom
- Peterborough Cathedral, England, United Kingdom
- Cathedral Church of St Peter and St Paul, Sheffield, England, United Kingdom
- Winchester Cathedral, England, United Kingdom
- Llandaff Cathedral, Cardiff, Wales, United Kingdom

=== Russia ===
- Cathedral of Saints Peter and Paul, Petergof, Saint Petersburg
- Saints Peter and Paul Cathedral, Saint Petersburg
- St. Peter and St. Paul Cathedral, Saratov
- Saints Peter and Paul Cathedral (Kazan), Tatarstan

== See also ==
- All pages with titles containing "Cathedral" and "Peter" and "Paul"
- All pages with titles containing "Archicathedral" and "Peter" and "Paul"
- Basilica of Saints Peter and Paul
- St. Peter and St. Paul's Church (disambiguation)
- St. Peter's Cathedral (disambiguation)
- St. Paul's Cathedral (disambiguation)
