= Saint Peter and Paul Cathedral, Kara =

Church in Kara, Togo

Saint Peter and Paul Cathedral
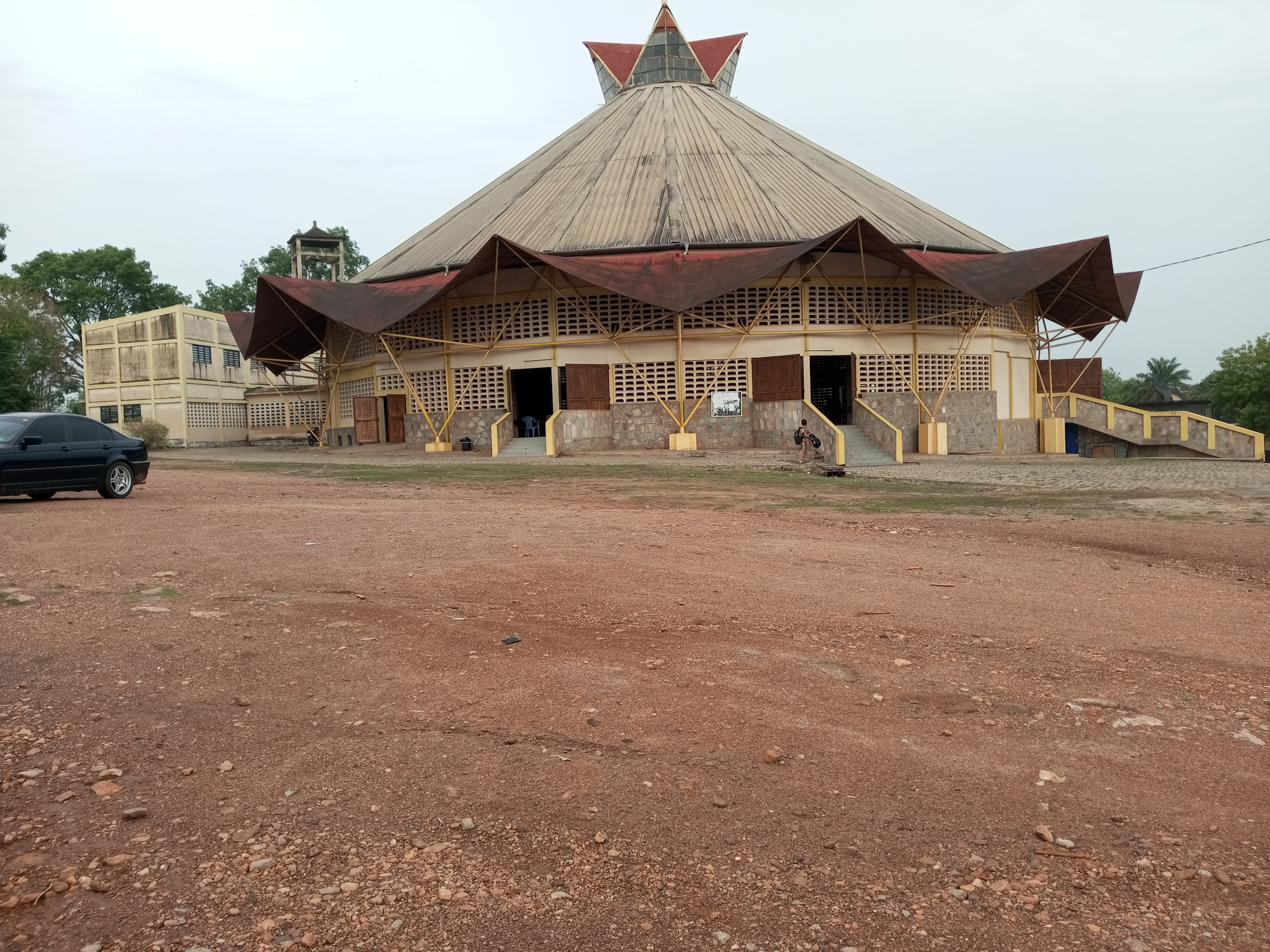
- The cathedral in 2023
- Saint Peter and Paul Cathedral
- 9.5529°N 1.1888°E
- Country: Togo
- Denomination: Roman Catholic

History
- Consecrated: 31 December 2001

Architecture
- Years built: 6

Administration
- Diocese: Diocese of Kara

The Saint Peter and Paul Cathedral (French: Cathédrale Saint-Pierre-et-Saint-Paul de Kara) is a Roman Catholic church located in the city of Kara in the West African country Togo. It is the cathedral of the Diocese of Kara.

== History ==
The construction of the cathedral took six years and was funded by German, French and Italian dioceses, as well as by the Pontifical Mission Societies and the Togolese State. The church was consecrated on 31 December 2001 by Ignace Sambar-Talkena, the bishop of Kara, assisted by the archbishop of Lomé, Philippe Kpodzro, in the presence of a large crow and of the president of the country, Gnassingbé Eyadéma.

It is built with local materials and offers space for 2,500 worshippers, having a surface area of 1,256 m^{2}.

== See also ==
- Roman Catholicism in Togo
- Cathedral of Saints Peter and Paul (disambiguation)
