= Edmond Yawo Amekuse =

Togolese Roman Catholic prelate (born 1967)

The Most Reverend Edmond Yawo Amekuse
- Bishop of Kpalimé
- Church: Catholic Church
- Archdiocese: Archdiocese of Lomé
- See: Diocese of Kpalimé
- Appointed: 26 June 2026
- Installed: 29 August 2026
- Predecessor: Benoît Comlan Messan Alowonou (4 July 2001 - 26 June 2026)

Orders
- Ordination: 28 December 1996
- Consecration: 29 August 2026
- Rank: Bishop

Personal details
- Born: Edmond Yawo Amekuse; 16 November 1967 (age 58) Agou-Akoumahou, Plateaux Region, Togo
- Motto: "Adiutores gaudi vestri" (Helpers of your joy)

Styles of Edmond Yawo Amekuse
- Reference style: Your Lordship; The Most Reverend
- Spoken style: His Lordship
- Religious style: Bishop

Edmond Yawo Amekuse (born 16 November 1967) is a Togolese Roman Catholic prelate who has served Bishop of the Diocese of Kpalimé, in Togo since 26 June 2026. Before that, from 28 December 1996 until 26 June 2026, he served as a priest of the same Catholic diocese. He was appointed bishop by Pope Leo XIV.

== Background and education ==
He was born on 16 November 1967, in Agou-Akoumahou, in the Diocese of Kpalimé, in Plateaux Region, Togo. He studied philosophy and theology at the Saint Jean-Pual II Major Seminary in Lomé. He holds a degree in Theology from the Institut Catholique Missionnaire d'Abidjan, Côte d'Ivoire a component of the Catholic University of West Africa, where he studied from 1999 until 2000. From 2000 until 2001, he studied at the Pontifical Institute for Arabic and Islamic Studies (PISAI), in Rome, Italy where he studied "Interreligious Dialogue". His Doctorate in Liturgy was awarded by the Pontifical Athenaeum of Saint Anselm (Anselmianum) in Rome, where he studied from 2001 intil 2008.

== Priest ==
He was ordained a priest on 28 December 1996, for the Diocese of Kpalimé. He served as a priest until 26 June 2026. While a priest, he served in various roles and locations, including:

- Parish Vicar of the Saint-Esprit Cathedral of Kpalimé from 1996 until 1999.
- Teacher of Religion at the Kpalimé Multipurpose College from 1996 until 1999.
- Studies at the Catholic University of West Africa in Abidjan, Côte d'Ivoire, leading to the award of a Bachelor's Degree in Theology from 1999 until 2000.
- Studies in "Interreligious Dialogue" at PISAI in Rome, Italy from 2000 until 2001.
- Studies at the Anselmianum in Rome, leading to the award of a Doctorate in Liturgy from 2001 until 2008.
- Professor of Liturgy at the Saint Jean-Paul II Major Seminary in Lomé from 2008 until 2023.
- Chaplain at the Catholic University of West Africa, Lomé, Togo Campus from 2008 until 2016.
- Secretary General at the Catholic University of West Africa, Lomé, Togo from 2013 until 2019.
- Formator at the Saint Jean-Paul II Major Seminary in Lomé from 2020 until 2023.
- Secretary General of the Catholic University of West Africa in Ouagadougou, Burkina Faso.

== Bishop ==
On 26 June 2026, Pope Leo XIV accepted the resignation of Bishop fr:Benoît Comlan Messan Alowonou from the pastoral care of the Catholic Diocese of Kpalimé in Togo. On the same day, The Holy Father appointed Reverend Father Monsignor Edmond Yawo Amekuse, previously a member of the clergy of the same Catholic see, to succeed at Kpalimé.

== See also ==
- Catholic Church in Togo

== Succession table ==
Catholic Church titles
| Preceded by Benoît Comlan Messan Alowonou (4 July 2001 – 26 June 2026) | Bishop of Kpalimé (since 26 June 2026) | Incumbent |
