= Isaac Jogues Agbémenya Kodjo Gaglo =

Togolese Catholic prelate (born 1958)

The Most Reverend Isaac Jogues Agbémenya Kodjo Gaglo
- Archbishop of Lomé, Togo
- Church: Catholic Church
- Archdiocese: Archdiocese of Lomé
- Appointed: 10 April 2026
- Installed: 10 April 2026
- Other posts: Bishop of Aného, Togo (3 December 2007 - 10 April 2026); Apostolic Administrator of Lomé, Togo (6 August 2024 - 10 April 2026)

Orders
- Ordination: 9 August 1985 by Pope John Paul II
- Consecration: 2 February 2008 by Cardinal Théodore-Adrien Sarr
- Rank: Archbishop

Personal details
- Born: Isaac Jogues Agbémenya Kodjo Gaglo; 7 October 1958 (age 67) Kpémé, Diocese of Aného, Maritime Region, Togo
- Motto: "IN FINEM DILEXIT EOS" (He loved them unto the end)
- Coat of arms

Styles of Isaac Jogues Agbémenya Kodjo Gaglo
- Reference style: Your Lordship; The Most Reverend
- Spoken style: His Lordship
- Religious style: Bishop

Isaac Jogues Agbémenya Kodjo Gaglo (born 7 October 1958) is a Togolese Catholic prelate who is the archbishop of the Archdiocese of Lomé, Togo. He previously served as the bishop of Diocese of Aného (2007 – 2026) and the Apostolic Administrator of the Archdiocese of Lomé (2024 – 2026). He was appointed bishop by Pope Benedict XVI and was consecrated by Cardinal Théodore-Adrien Sarr, Archbishop of Dakar on 2 February 2008. Pope Leo XIV elevated him to archbishop and transferred him to the Archdiocese of Lomé on 10 April 2026.

== Background and education ==
He was born on 7 October 1958 in Kpémé in the Diocese of Aného, Maritime Region, Togo. He studied philosophy and theology at seminary before he was ordained a priest. He holds a Doctorate in Moral Theology obtained from an institution in Innsbruck, Austria in 1997.

== Priest ==
He was ordained a priest for the Archdiocese of Lomé, Togo on 9 August 1985, by Pope John Paul II. He served as a priest until 3 December 2007. While a priest, he served in various roles and locations including:

- Assistant parish priest in Lomé from 1986 until 1991.
- Professor at the Saint Pius X Minor Seminary in Lomé from 1986 until 1991.
- Studies in Innsbruck, Austria, leading to the award of a doctorate in Moral Theology from 1992 until 1997.
- Parish Priest and Head of Family Ministry from 1998 until 2005.
- Diocesan Consultor in 2004.
- Diocesan Administrator of Aného Catholic Diocese from 2005 until 2007.

== Bishop ==
On 3 Dember 2007, Pope Benedict XVI appointed him Bishop of Aného Catholic Diocese. He was consecrated and installed at Aného, Togo on 2 February 2008. The Principal Consecrator was Cardinal Théodore-Adrien Sarr, Archbishop of Dakar and was assisted by Robert-Casimir Tonyui Messan Dosseh-Anyron, Archbishop Emeritus of Lomé and Ambroise Kotamba Djoliba, Bishop of Sokodé. While local ordinary at Aného, Bishop Isaac Jogues Agbémenya Kodjo Gaglo served as Apostolic Administrator of the Metropolitan Archdiocese of Lomé from 6 August 2024 until 10 April 2026. On 10 April 2026, Pope Leo XIV appointed him Archbishop of Lomé.

== See also ==
- Catholic Church in Togo

== Succession table ==
Catholic Church titles
Preceded by fr:Nicodème Anani Barrigah-Benissan (23 November 2019 - 4 August 2024)	Archbishop of Lomé (since 10 April 2026)	Succeeded by (Incumbent)
Preceded by fr:Paul Jean-Marie Dossavi (23 February 1996 - 13 September 2005)	Bishop of Aného (3 December 2007 - 10 April 2026)	Succeeded by (Vacant)
