= Benoît Comlan Messan Alowonou =

Togolese Catholic prelate (born 1949)

The Most Reverend Benoît Comlan Messan Alowonou
- Bishop Emeritus of Kpalimé, Togo
- Church: Catholic Church
- Archdiocese: Roman Catholic Archdiocese of Lomé
- See: Diocese of Kpalimé
- Appointed: 4 July 2001
- Installed: 29 September 2001
- Term ended: 26 June 2026
- Predecessor: fr:Pierre Koffi Seshie (1 July 1994 - 25 April 2000)
- Successor: Edmond Yawo Amekuse (since 26 June 2026)

Orders
- Ordination: 28 July 1984
- Consecration: 29 September 2001 by Philippe Fanoko Kossi Kpodzro
- Rank: Bishop

Personal details
- Born: Benoît Comlan Messan Alowonou; 5 March 1949 (age 77) Tsévié, Maritime Region, Togo
- Motto: "Sufficit tibi gratia mea" (My grace is sufficient for you)

Styles of Benoît Comlan Messan Alowonou
- Reference style: Your Lordship; The Most Reverend
- Spoken style: His Lordship
- Religious style: Bishop

Benoît Comlan Messan Alowonou (born 5 March 1949), is a Togolese Catholic prelate who served as the Bishop of the Catholic Diocese of Kpalimé, in Togo from 4 July 2001 until his retirement on 26 June 2026. Before that, from 28 July 1984 until 4 July 2001, he served as a priest of the Roman Catholic Archdiocese of Lomé, Togo. Pope John Paul II appointed him bishop. He received his episcopal consecration at Kpalimé on 29 September 2001 by the hands of Philippe Fanoko Kossi Kpodzro, Archbishop of Lomé. On 26 June 2026, Pope Leo XIV accepted the resignation from the administration of the Catholic Diocese of Kpalimé, Togo, submitted by Bishop Benoît Comlan Messan Alowonou. That same day, The Holy Father appointed Edmond Yawo Amekuse to succeed at Kpalimé.

== Early life and education ==
Benoît Comlan Messan Alowonou was born on 5 March 1949 at Tsévié, Maritime Region, Togo. He completed his primary and secondary education near his home area. In 1978, he entered the "Saint Gall" Major Seminary in Quidah, Benin. From 1996 until 2000, he studied in Metz, France, graduating with a degree in Pastoral Theology.

== Priest ==
He was ordained a priest on 28 July 1984 and was incardinated in the Archdiocese of Lome. He served as a priest until 4 July 2001.

While a priest, he served in various roles and locations, including:

- Professor and Spiritual Director at the Minor Seminary of Lomé from 1984 until 1991.
- Personal Secretary to the Apostolic Administrator of Lomé from 1992 until 1993.
- Parish Vicar at the Cathedral of Lomé from 1994 until 1995.
- Vicar General of Lomé from 1995 until 1996.
- Dean of a pastoral area within the Archdiocese of Lomé from 1995 until 1996.
- Studies in Metz, France leading to the award of a degree in Pastoral Theology from 1996 until 2000.
- Professor and Adjunct Spiritual Director at the "Jean Paul II" Major Seminary in Lomé during 2001.

== Bishop ==
On 4 July 2001, Pope John Paul II appointed him Bishop of the Diocese of Kpalimé, Togo. He was consecrated bishop at Kpalimé on 29 September 2001. The Principal Consecrator was Philippe Fanoko Kossi Kpodzro, Archbishop of Lomé who was assisted by Jean Pierre Marie Orchampt, Bishop Emeritus of Angers and Francis Anani Kofi Lodonu, Bishop of Ho. He serves as the president of the Episcopal Conference of Togo since 2012.

On 26 June 2026, Pope Leo XIV accepted the age-related retirement request submitted by Bishop Benoît Comlan Messan Alowonou from the pastoral administration of the Catholic Diocese of Kpalimé, Togo. That same day, The Holy Father appointed Edmond Yawo Amekuse, to succeed at Kpalimé.

== See also ==
- Catholic Church in Togo

== Succession table ==
Catholic Church titles
Preceded by fr:Pierre Koffi Seshie (1 July 1994 - 25 April 2000)	Bishop of Kpalime (4 July 2001 - 26 June 2026)	Succeeded by Edmond Yawo Amekuse (since 26 June 2026)
