= Joseph-Paul Strebler =

Joseph-Paul Strebler SMA
- Archbishop of Lomé
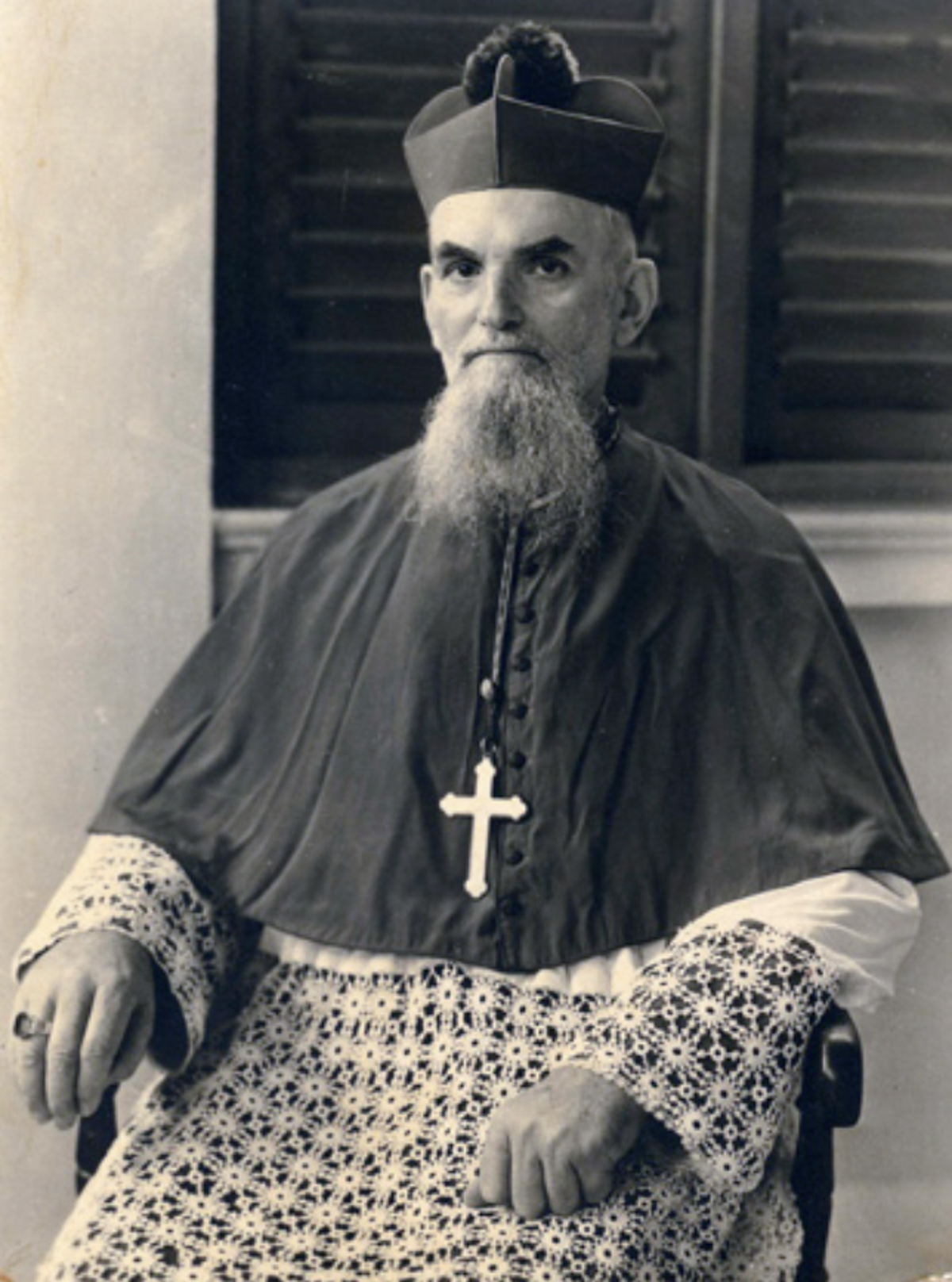
- Mgr. Joseph Strebler SMA
- Church: Catholic Church
- Archdiocese: Archdiocese of Lomé
- In office: 8 November 1945 – 16 June 1961
- Predecessor: Jean-Marie Cessou
- Successor: Robert-Casimir Dosseh-Anyron
- Other post: Titular Archbishop of Nicopolis in Epiro (1961-1971)
- Previous posts: Titular Bishop of Curubis (1945-1955); Prefect of Sokodé (1937-1945)

Orders
- Ordination: 10 July 1921 by Jules Moury
- Consecration: 29 June 1946 by Jean-Julien Weber

Personal details
- Born: 12 September 1892 Mertzwiller, Alsace–Lorraine, German Empire
- Died: 12 March 1984 (aged 91) Saint-Pierre, Bas-Rhin, France

Joseph-Paul Strebler (12 September 1892, Mertzwiller – 12 March 1984, Saint-Pierre) was a French Roman Catholic bishop and missionary. He was ordained a Priest of the Society of African Missions on 10 July 1921. He was assigned to Togo in 1937, appointed Prefect of Sokodé on 24 July 1937. He became Archbishop of Lomé on 14 September 1955, a position which he served until 16 June 1961. On 16 June 1961 he was appointed Titular Archbishop of Nicopolis in Epirus, a position he held until his resignation on 11 June 1971.

Catholic Church titles
Preceded by none	Archbishop of Lomé; 1955-1961	Succeeded by Robert-Casimir Dosseh-Anyron
Preceded by Antonio Cardona Riera	Titular Archbishop of Nicopolis; 1961-1971	Succeeded by none
