= Holy Spirit Cathedral, Kpalimé =

Holy Spirit Cathedral
- Cathédrale Saint Esprit de Kpalimé
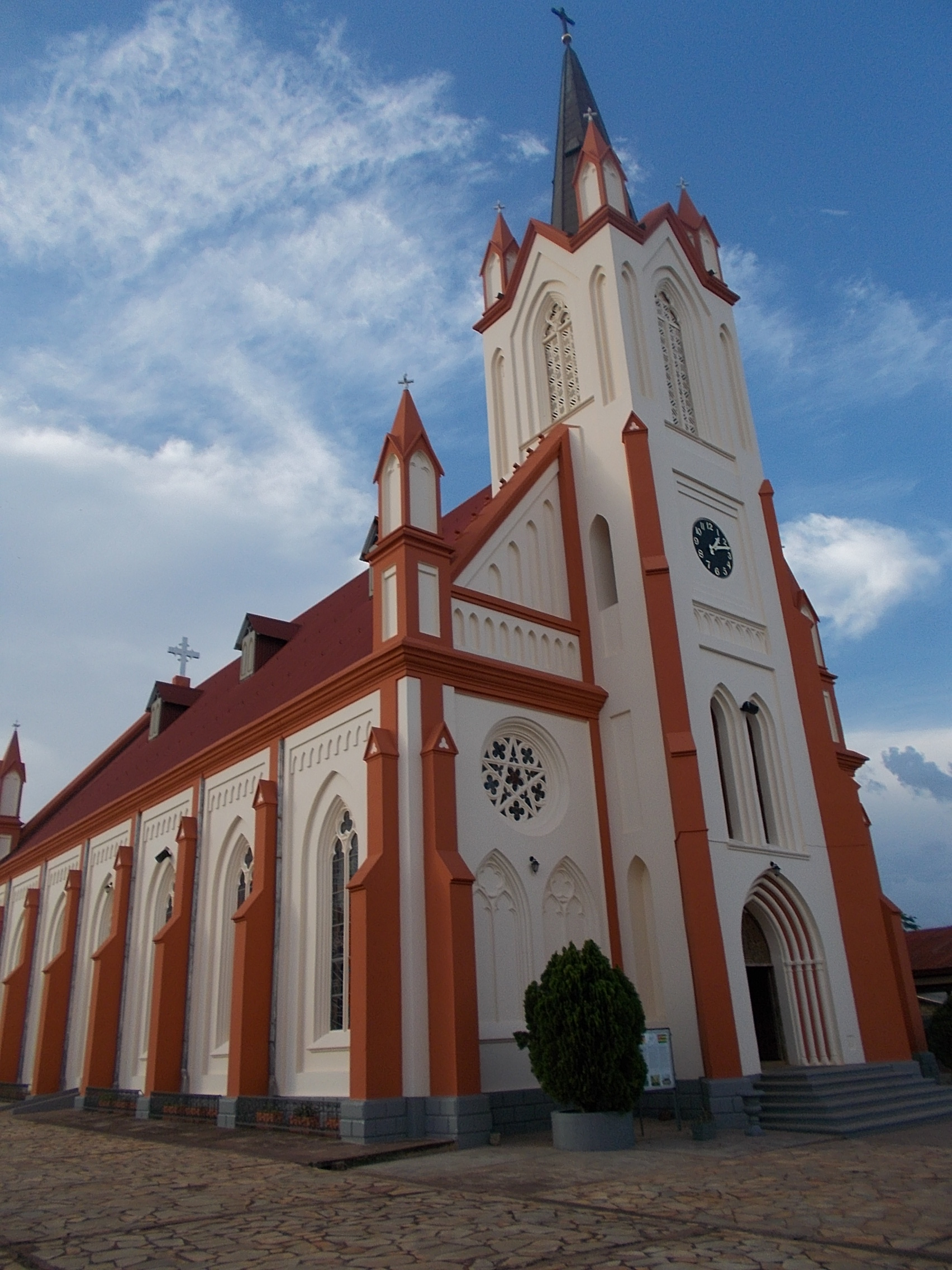
- Holy Spirit Cathedral
- Location: Kpalimé
- Country: Togo
- Denomination: Roman Catholic Church

The Holy Spirit Cathedral (French: Cathédrale Saint Esprit de Kpalimé), also known as Holy Ghost Cathedral or simply Cathedral of Kpalimé, is a Christian religious building located in the town of Kpalimé (also written Palimé) in the southern part of the African country of Togo.

The cathedral follows the Roman or Latin rite and serves as the seat of the Diocese of Kpalimé (Dioecesis Kpalimensis; Diocèse de Kpalimé) which was created in 1994 by the bull "Supremo in Ecclesia" by Pope John Paul II.

== History ==
The cathedral has its origins in the main station and the Holy Spirit parish founded in 1902 by Monsignor Hermann Bücking SVD, in the time when Togo was a possession of the German Empire. The first stone of the present cathedral was laid by German missionaries in 1913 and was blessed in 1914. It was restored in 2001 and was consecrated as a cathedral in 2003.

== See also ==
- Roman Catholicism in Togo
- Holy Spirit Cathedral
