= Buhain =

Buhain is a surname, commonly used in the Philippines. Notable people with the surname include:

- Eileen Ermita-Buhain (born 1969), Filipino politician
- Eric Buhain (born 1970), Filipino politician and former competitive swimmer
- Teodoro Buhain (1937–2024), Filipino Roman Catholic bishop
