= Jacques Danka Longa =

Roman Catholic bishop

- Bishop of Kara
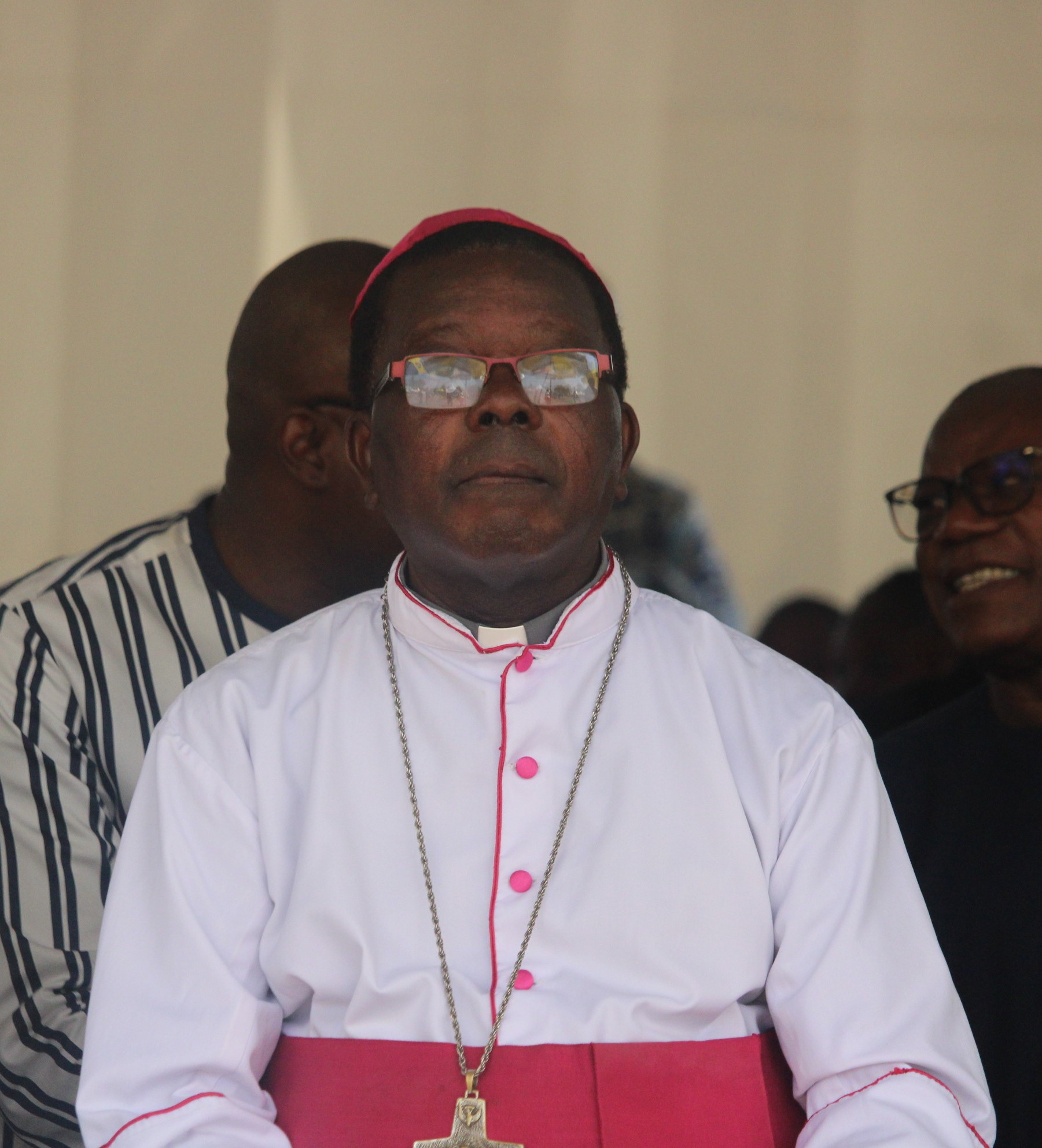
- Church: Catholic Church
- Diocese: Diocese of Kara
- Installed: 7 January 2009
- Predecessor: Ignace Baguibassa Sambar-Talkena
- Previous post: Coadjutor Bishop of Kara (2008-2009)

Orders
- Ordination: 25 January 1992
- Consecration: 26 July 2008 by Michael A. Blume

Personal details
- Born: 26 July 1961 (age 64) Sokodé, Centrale Region, Togo

Jacques Danka Longa (born 26 July 1961) is the third and current Roman Catholic bishop of the Roman Catholic Diocese of Kara, Togo.

Born in Sokodé, he studied physics at the University of Lomé before entering the Grand séminaire Saint-Gall de Ouidah, Benin, where he obtained a baccalaureat in theology. Following his ordination to the priesthood on 25 January 1992, he was appointed spiritual director and lecturer at the Séminaire interdiocésain Saint-Paul de Notsé in the Diocese of Kpalimé. After this, he continued his studies in theology at the Pontifical Urban University, Rome where he specialised in Canon Law. In 2003, he was named rector of the Grand séminaire interdiocésain Jean-Paul II, Lomé.

He was appointed and ordained coadjutor bishop of Kara in 2008 and bishop of Kara in 2009, following the resignation of his predecessor Ignace Baguibassa Sambar-Talkena.
