= Ambroise Kotamba Djoliba =

Togolese Roman Catholic prelate (1938–2024)

His Excellency Ambroise Kotamba Djoliba
- Bishop Emeritus of Sokodé
- Metropolis: Lomé
- Installed: 5 April 1993
- Term ended: 3 January 2016
- Predecessor: Chrétien Matawo Bakpessi
- Successor: Celestin-Marie Gaoua

Orders
- Ordination: 11 April 1966
- Consecration: 7 August 1993 by Philippe Fanoko Kpodzro

Personal details
- Born: 1938 Siou, French Togoland
- Died: 15 March 2024 (aged 85–86) Sokodé, Togo

Ambroise Kotamba Djoliba (1938 – 15 March 2024) was a Togolese Roman Catholic prelate. He was bishop of Sokodé from 1993 to 2016.

Catholic Church titles
Preceded by Chrétien Matawo Bakpessi	Bishop of Sokodé; 1993–2016	Succeeded by Celestin-Marie Gaoua
