= Jean Paul II Interdiocesan Major Seminary =

The Jean-Paul II Interdiocesan Major Seminary (French: Grand séminaire interdiocésain Jean-Paul II) is a Roman Catholic Seminary in the Hédjranawoé district of Lomé, the capital of Togo. It was opened in 1988 as a training center for priests. 95 students were enrolled in 1992, 159 in 1999, and 307 in 2008.

== Rectors ==
2003-2008 Jacques Danka Longa
