= Ignace Baguibassa Sambar-Talkena =

Togolese catholic priest (1935-2013)

- Bishop of Kara
- Church: Catholic Church
- Diocese: Diocese of Kara
- In office: 30 November 1996 – 7 January 2009
- Predecessor: Ernest Patili Assi
- Successor: Jacques Danka Longa

Orders
- Ordination: 30 June 1963
- Consecration: 6 January 1997 by Pope John Paul II

Personal details
- Born: 31 March 1935 Baga, Mandatory French Togoland, French West Africa, French Empire
- Died: 3 February 2013 (aged 77) Lomé, Togo

Ignace Baguibassa Sambar-Talkena (March 31, 1935 – February 3, 2013) was the second bishop of the Roman Catholic Diocese of Kara, Togo.

Ordained to the priesthood on 30 June 1963, Sambar-Talkena was ordained bishop on 6 January 1996, following the death of his predecessor Ernest Patili Assi. He resigned on 7 January 2009 and was succeeded by Jacques Danka Longa. He held the title of bishop emeritus until his death in Lomé in 2013.

He was born in the village of Baga, a village neighboring Niamtougou. He spoke Nawdm and French.

For many years he was President of the Episcopal Commission for Catholic Education in the Bishops' Conference of Togo.
