= Teodoro Buhain =

Filipino Roman Catholic prelate (1937–2024)

His Excellency, The Most Reverend Teodoro Buhain D.D
- Auxiliary Bishop of Manila
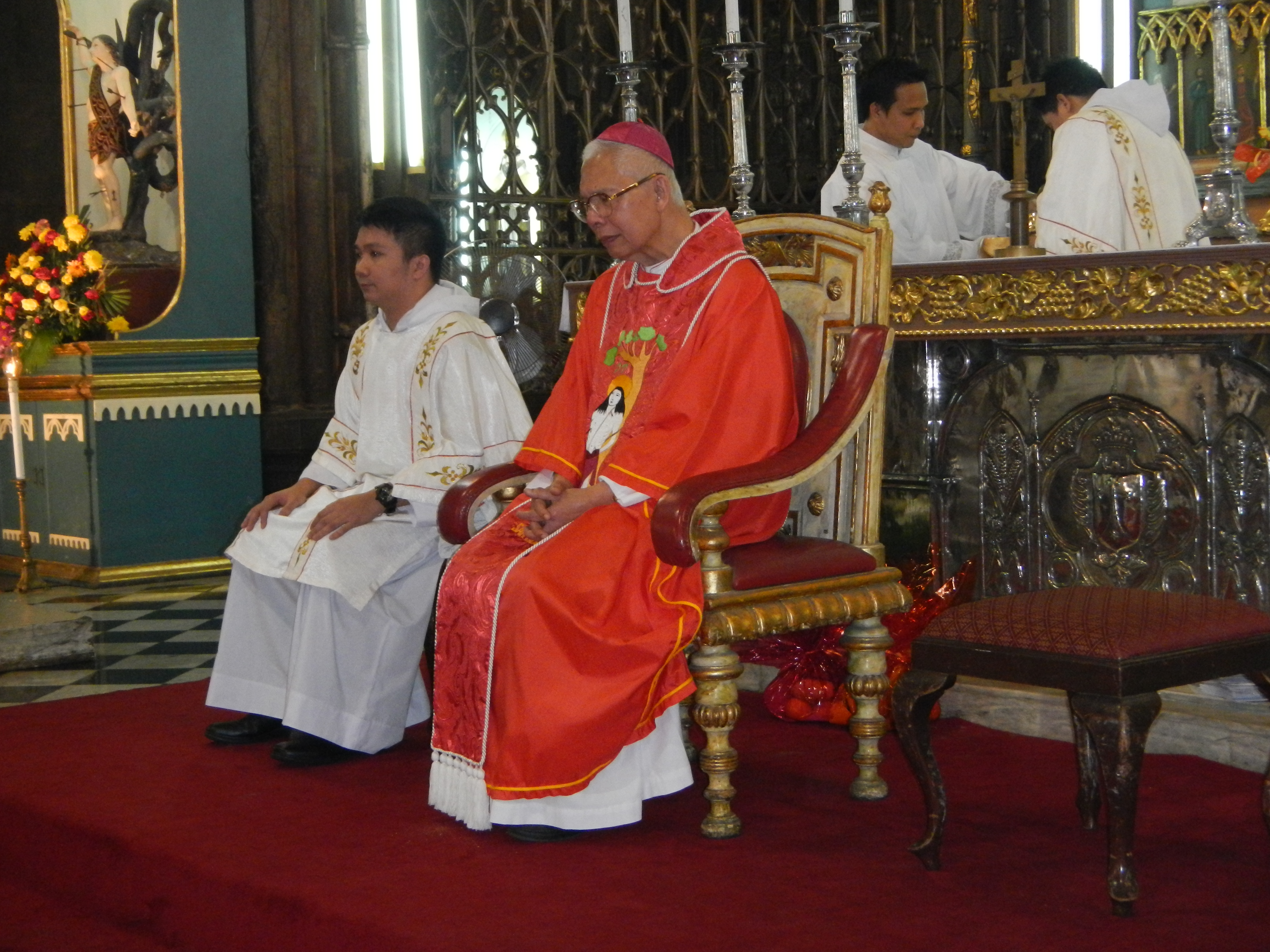
- Buhain in 2014
- Province: Manila
- See: Manila
- Appointed: January 5, 1983
- Term ended: September 23, 2003
- Other post: Titular Bishop of Bacanaria (1983–2024)

Orders
- Ordination: December 21, 1960
- Consecration: February 21, 1983 by Bruno Torpigliani

Personal details
- Born: Teodoro Javier Buhain Jr. August 4, 1937 Bacoor, Cavite, Philippine Commonwealth
- Died: November 13, 2024 (aged 87) San Juan, Metro Manila, Philippines
- Denomination: Roman Catholic
- Motto: Spes in Domino ('Hope in the Lord')

Ordination history
History
Episcopal consecration
- Principal consecrator: Bruno Torpigliani
- Co-consecrators: Oscar V. Cruz; Amado Paulino y Hernandez
- Styles
- Reference style: His Excellency; The Most Reverend
- Spoken style: Your Excellency
- Religious style: Bishop

Teodoro Javier Buhain Jr. (August 4, 1937 – November 13, 2024) was a Filipino prelate of the Catholic Church. He served as auxiliary bishop of Manila from 1983 to 2003. He was also the titular bishop of Bacanaria until his death.

== Biography ==
Teodoro Javier Buhain was born on August 4, 1937 in Bacoor, Cavite. He received his priestly formation at the Manila Theological Seminary. He was ordained a priest on December 21, 1960.

On January 5, 1983, Pope John Paul II appointed him as auxiliary bishop of Manila with the titular see of Bacanaria. He was ordained a bishop on February 21, 1983, in the Manila Cathedral. He was ordained a bishop by Archbishop Bruno Torpigliani, Apostolic Nuncio to the Philippines, assisted by Oscar Cruz, Metropolitan Archbishop of San Fernando, and Amado Paulino y Hernandez, Auxiliary Bishop of Manila.

In his role as auxiliary bishop, Buhain assisted the Archbishop of Manila, Cardinal Jaime Sin, one of the country’s most powerful religious figures, from 1983 to 2003. During this time, Buhain was subjected to allegations of sexual and financial misconduct which he denied. He later said that Sin had prevented a proper investigation from being conducted.

On October 31, 2003, the Holy See accepted his resignation from his duties as auxiliary bishop of Manila amid continuing allegations of impropriety involving him. However he cited his role as auxiliary bishop being terminus ad quem or co-terminus with retired Manila archbishop Cardinal Sin as the reason for the resignation. He later filed an unsuccessful libel suit against journalist Aries Rufo, who reported on the accusations. The case was dismissed in 2013.

Buhain also served as former general manager of Radio Veritas and parish priest of Quiapo Church from 1999 to 2004.

== Death ==
Buhain died at the Cardinal Santos Medical Center in San Juan, Metro Manila on November 13, 2024, at the age of 87.

Catholic Church titles
Preceded by —	Auxiliary Bishop of Manila; January 5, 1983 – September 23, 2003	Succeeded by —
Preceded by Bienvenido Mercado	Rector of Quiapo Church; 1999–2004	Succeeded by Josefino Ramirez
Preceded by Philippe Fanoko Kpodzro	— TITULAR — Bishop of Bacanaria; January 5, 1983 – November 13, 2024	Sede vacante
