= Mertzwiller =

Mertzwiller Merzwiller
- Commune
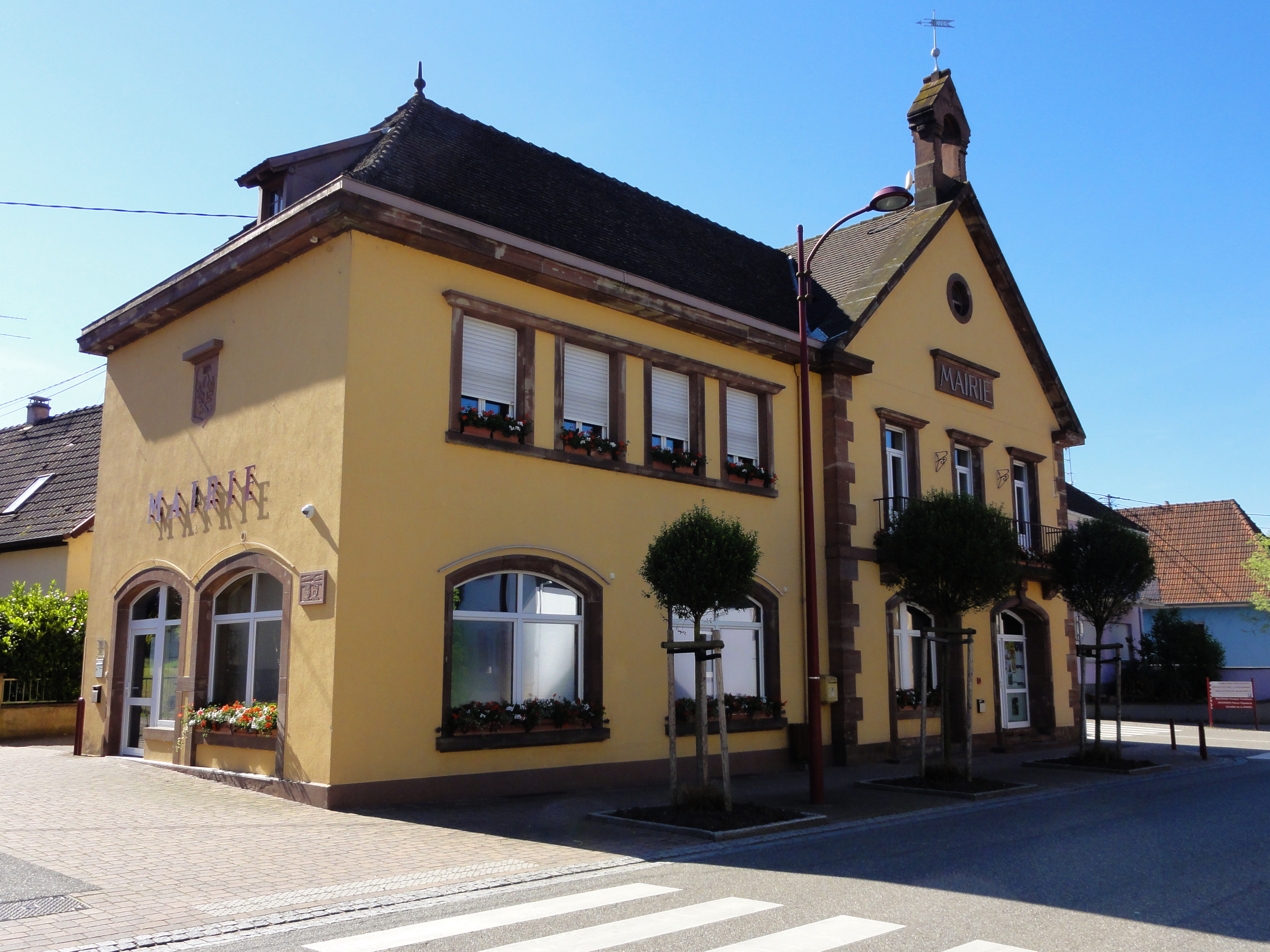
- The town hall in Mertzwiller

- Coat of arms
- Location of Mertzwiller
- Location within France Location within Grand Est
- Coordinates: 48°51′49″N 7°40′50″E
- Country: France
- Region: Grand Est
- Department: Bas-Rhin
- Arrondissement: Haguenau-Wissembourg
- Canton: Reichshoffen

Government
  - Mayor (2020–2026): Michel Schweighoffer
- Area^{1}: 6.96 km^{2} (2.69 sq mi)
- Elevation: 160 m (520 ft)
- Highest elevation: 207 m (679 ft)
- Lowest elevation: 152 m (499 ft)
- Population (2023): 3,343
  - Density: 480/km^{2} (1,240/sq mi)
- Time zone: UTC+01:00 (CET)
  - Summer (DST): UTC+02:00 (CEST)
- INSEE/Postal code: 67291 /67580
- ^{1} French Land Register data, which excludes lakes, ponds, glaciers > 1 km^{2} (0.386 sq mi or 247 acres) and river estuaries.

Mertzwiller (German: Merzweiler) is a commune in the Bas-Rhin department in Grand Est in north-eastern France.

== Population ==
Historical population
| Year | Pop. | ±% p.a. |
|---|---|---|
| 1968 | 2,948 | — |
| 1975 | 3,282 | +1.55% |
| 1982 | 3,408 | +0.54% |
| 1990 | 3,524 | +0.42% |
| 1999 | 3,507 | −0.05% |
| 2007 | 3,504 | −0.01% |
| 2012 | 3,413 | −0.52% |
| 2017 | 3,355 | −0.34% |
| 2023 | 3,343 | −0.06% |
Source: INSEE

== Notable people ==
- Sam Marx, father of the Marx Brothers
- Joseph-Paul Strebler, missionary and bishop in Togo

== See also ==
- Communes of the Bas-Rhin department
