= Catholic Church in Togo =

The Catholic Church in Togo is part of the worldwide Catholic Church, under the spiritual leadership of the Pope in Rome.

There are approximately 1,483,000 million Catholics representing approximately 25 percent of the total population of 5,968,000. There are seven dioceses, including one archdiocese:

- Lomé
  - Aného
  - Atakpamé
  - Dapaong
  - Kara
  - Kpalimé
  - Sokodé

== History ==
The history of the Catholic Church in Togo began with the evangelization carried out by the missionaries of the Society of African Missions of Lyon starting in 1882; four years later the Togo mission was founded, but its founder, the priest Jeremiah Moran, was poisoned in 1886.

In 1892 the mission was entrusted to the Missionaries of the Divine Word, and made an apostolic vicariate in 1914. Because of the First World War, the Verbites, all Germans, were first interned and then expelled from the country. So evangelism passed again, in 1921, to the Fathers of the African missions: in 1930 there was the priestly ordination of the first Togolese.

On 15 September 1955 the ecclesiastical hierarchy was established and the country was divided into dioceses. The Togolese Caritas (Caritas togolaise) was founded in 1967. In 1987, it merged with the Development Coordination Office (Bureau de coordination pour le développement) to become the Charity Organisation for Integral Development - Caritas Togo. Caritas Togo is the official aid organisation of the Catholic Church in Togo.

In 1985, the Togolese Catholic Church received a pastoral visit from Pope John Paul II.

On 8 April 2014, the Congregation for Divine Worship and the Discipline of the Sacraments confirmed Saint John Paul II as the patron saint of Togo.

== Apostolic Nunciature to Togo ==
The apostolic delegation of Togo and Guinea was established on 21 May 1973 with the brief Qui benignissima of Pope Paul VI; it was based in the city of Abidjan in the Ivory Coast. In 1982, with the establishment of diplomatic relations between the Holy See and the Togo, the apostolic nunciature of Togo was created. The seat of the nuncio is the city of Cotonou in Benin.

=== Apostolic Delegates ===
- Bruno Wüstenberg, Titular Archbishop of Tire (19 Dec 1973 Appointed - 17 Jan 1979 Appointed, Apostolic Pro-Nuncio to the Netherlands)
- Giuseppe Ferraioli, Titular Archbishop of Volturno (25 Aug 1979 Appointed - 21 Jul 1981 Appointed, Apostolic Pro-Nuncio to Kenya)

=== Apostolic pro-nuncios ===
- Ivan Dias, Titular Archbishop of Rusubisir (8 May 1982 Appointed - 20 Jun 1987 Appointed, Apostolic Nuncio to Korea)
- Giuseppe Bertello, Titular Archbishop of Urbisaglia (17 October 1987 Appointed - 12 January 1991 Appointed, Apostolic Nuncio to Rwanda)
- Abraham Kattumana, Titular Archbishop of Cebarades (8 May 1991 – 16 December 1992 Appointed Pontifical Delegate for the Syro-Malabar Catholic Church and President of the Synod of the Syro-Malabar Church)

=== Apostolic nuncios ===
- André Pierre Louis Dupuy, Titular Archbishop of Selsey (6 Apr 1993 Appointed - 27 Mar 2000 Appointed, Apostolic Nuncio to Venezuela)
- George Kocherry, Titular Archbishop of Othona (June 10 2000 - 2002 Resigned)
- Pierre Nguyễn Văn Tốt, Titular Archbishop of Rusticiana (25 Nov 2002 Appointed - 24 Aug 2005 Appointed, Apostolic Nuncio to the Central African Republic)
- Michael August Blume, SVD Titular Archbishop of Alessano (24 Aug 2005 Appointed - 2 Feb 2013 Appointed, Apostolic Nuncio to Uganda)
- Brian Udaigwe, Titular Archbishop of Suelli (16 Jul 2013 Appointed - 13 Jun 2020 Appointed, Apostolic Nuncio to Sri Lanka)
- Mark Gerard Miles, from March 2, 2021

== Episcopal Conference of Togo ==
The local episcopate constitutes the Episcopal Conference of Togo (Conférence Episcopale du Togo, CET).

CET is a member of the Regional Episcopal Conference of West Africa (RECOWA) and of the Symposium of Episcopal Conferences of Africa and Madagascar (SECAM).

List of presidents:

- Robert-Casimir Tonyui Messan Dosseh-Anyron, Archbishop of Lomé (1970 - 1992)
- Philippe Fanoko Kossi Kpodzro, Archbishop of Lomé (1992 - 2006)
- Ambroise Kotamba Djoliba, Bishop of Sokodé (2006 - November 2012)
- Benoît Comlan Messan Alowonou, bishop of Kpalimé, since November 2012

List of Vice Presidents:

- Denis Komivi Amuzu-Dzakpah, Archbishop, then Archbishop Emeritus of Lomé, since November 2012
