= Pécs Cathedral =

Coordinates: 46.0786°N 18.2236°E

Sts. Peter and Paul's Cathedral Basilica
- Szent Péter és Szent Pál székesegyház
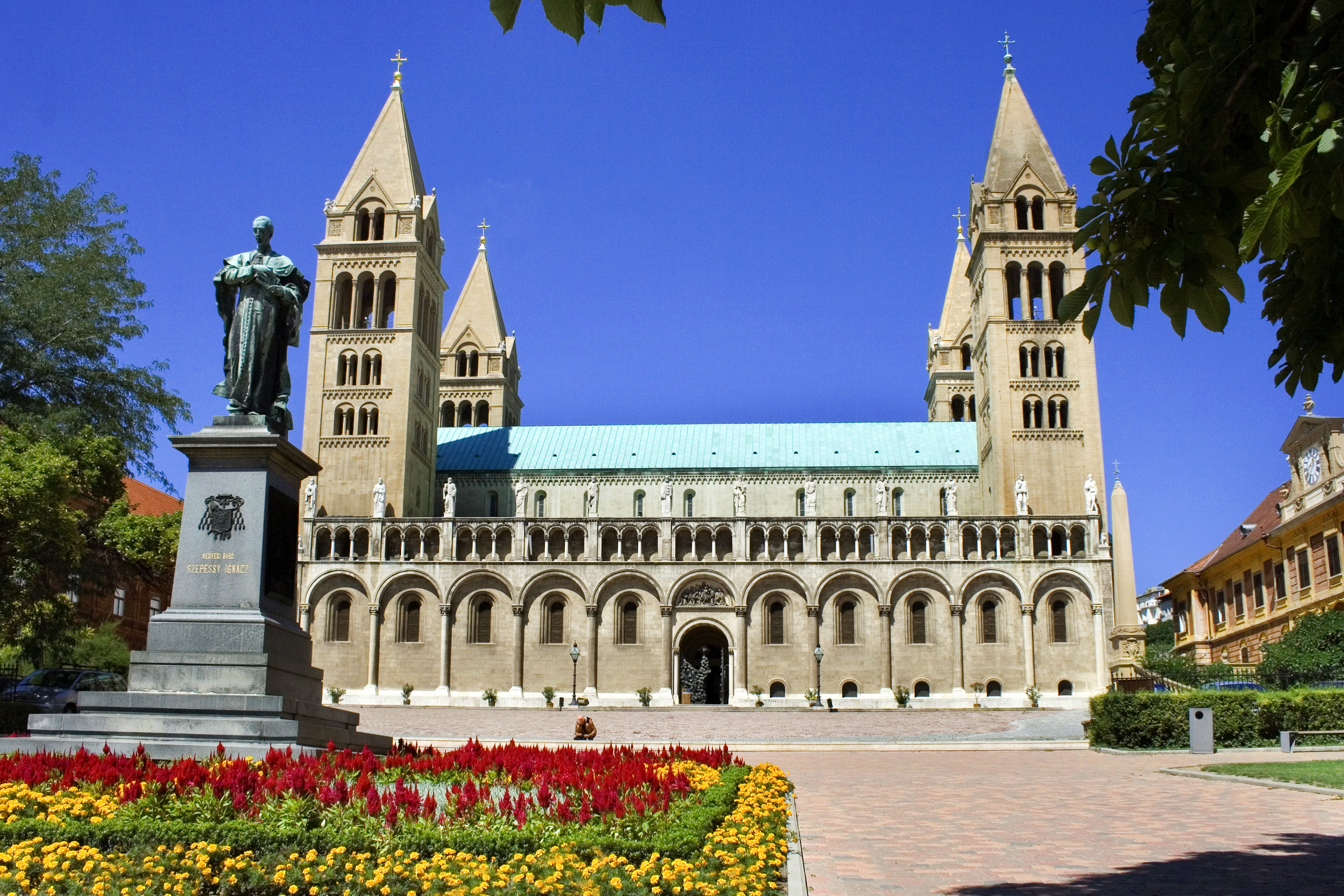
- Sts. Peter and Paul's Cathedral Basilica
- Location: Pécs
- Country: Hungary
- Denomination: Roman Catholic Church

Administration
- Province: Kalocsa-Kecskemét
- Metropolis: Archdiocese of Kalocsa-Kecskemét
- Diocese: Pécs

The Sts. Peter and Paul's Cathedral Basilica (Hungarian: Szent Péter és Szent Pál székesegyház), also called Pécs Cathedral, is a religious building of the Catholic church that serves as the cathedral of the Diocese of Pécs, and is located in the city of Pécs, Hungary.

The foundations of the cathedral of Pécs are from the Roman period, around the fourth century. It is believed that at the site of the cathedral today an early Christian basilica, which spread westwards between the eighth and ninth centuries. Under the reign of Stephen I, the decision to modify the construction and, presumably, the two western towers date from this period was taken. After a great fire of 1064 was carried out construction of the Romanesque basilica, with the participation of Italian architects. In the Middle Ages, the church was enlarged with two lateral towers and Gothic chapels. After the damage and degradation caused by the Turkish occupation (1543-1686) there were attempts to restore the building. The neo-Romanesque appearance today is the result of the reconstruction carried out between 1882 and 1891, faithfully fulfilled the plans of the Viennese architect Friedrich von Schmidt. The length of the church is 70 meters, with a width of 22 meters and height in the towers of up to 60 meters.

== See also ==
- Roman Catholicism in Hungary
- List of cathedrals in Hungary
- Sts. Peter and Paul Cathedral

== Gallery ==
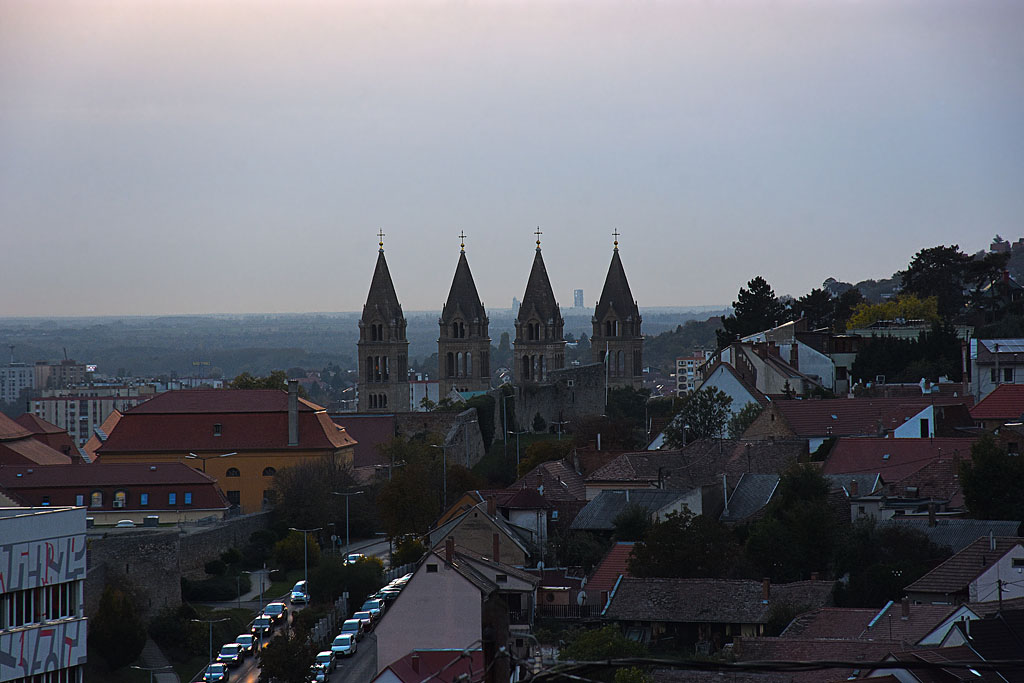
The towers of Cathedral
