= Julien Mawule Kouto =

Togolese Roman Catholic bishop

- Bishop of Atakpamé
- Church: Catholic Church
- Diocese: Diocese of Atakpamé
- In office: 18 October 1993 – 1 March 2006
- Predecessor: Philippe Fanoko Kpodzro
- Successor: Nicodème Barrigah-Benissan

Orders
- Ordination: 29 June 1975
- Consecration: 6 January 1994 by Pope John Paul II

Personal details
- Born: 19 June 1946 Lomé, French Togoland, French West Africa, French Empire
- Died: 5 June 2015 (aged 68)

Julien Mawule Kouto (19 June 1946 – 5 June 2015) was a Roman Catholic bishop.

Ordained to the priesthood in 1975, Kouto was appointed bishop of the Roman Catholic Diocese of Atakpamé, Togo, in 1994 and resigned in 2006.
