= Ernest Patili Assi =

First bishop of the Roman Catholic Diocese of Kara, Togo

- Bishop of Kara
- Church: Catholic Church
- Diocese: Diocese of Kara
- In office: 1 July 1994 – 16 February 1996
- Predecessor: Diocese erected
- Successor: Ignace Baguibassa Sambar-Talkena

Orders
- Ordination: 28 June 1964
- Consecration: 15 October 1994 by Jozef Tomko

Personal details
- Born: 31 December 1936 Bohou (northwest of Agounde), Mandatory French Togoland, French West Africa, French Empire
- Died: 16 February 1996 (aged 59)

Ernest Patili Assi (December 1936 – 16 February 1996), was the first bishop of the Roman Catholic Diocese of Kara, Togo. Ordained to the priesthood on 28 June 1964, he was ordained bishop of the newly created diocese on 15 October 1994 but died only 18 months later.

He was born in the canton of Bohou and spoke Kabiye and French.
