= Atsutsè Kokouvi Agbobli =

Togolese politician (1941–2008)

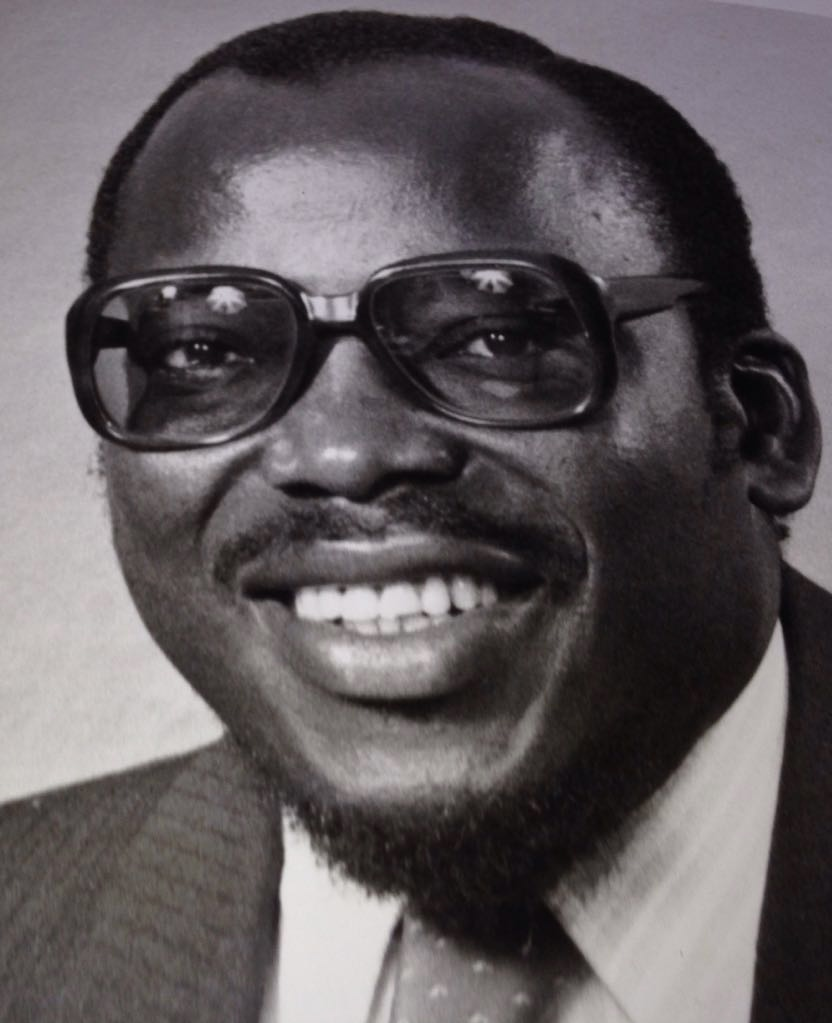

Atsutsè Kokouvi Agbobli (April 23, 1941 – August 15, 2008) was a Togolese politician. He served in the government under President Gnassingbé Eyadéma and was the President of the Movement for National Development (MODENA), an opposition party.

== Biography ==
Following the February 1994 parliamentary election, Agbobli was appointed as Minister of Communication and Culture on May 25, 1994; he was moved to the post of Minister in charge of Relations with Parliament on November 29, 1995. Subsequently, he announced in March 2007 the creation of a new opposition party, MODENA, to be launched on April 21, 2007. According to Agbobli, Togolese politics was excessively dominated by two large parties, the ruling Rally of the Togolese People (RPT) and the main opposition Union of Forces for Change (UFC), and he criticized both of them.

Agbobli was found dead on a beach in Lomé on August 15, 2008. The Ministry of Security stated on August 16 that Agbobli had attempted suicide on August 13 by ingesting a toxic substance and was admitted to a clinic, but subsequently left the clinic in the early hours of August 14 and was found dead the next day. In order to determine the cause of death, an autopsy was ordered on August 17; on the same day, the National Commission on Human Rights called for a commission of inquiry to investigate his death, and the UFC made a similar call on August 18.

On August 18, state prosecutor Robert Baoubadi Bakaï announced on television that the autopsy results showed that Agbobli died due to "drug poisoning". According to Bakaï, the autopsy did not reveal the specific drug responsible, but he said that it "systematically ruled out the possibility of a drowning". Although Agbobli was found with marks on his forehead, this was said to have been caused by his collapse. He was buried in his native village of Adéta in southwestern Togo on September 13.

Agbobli's children disputed the claim that he killed himself, arguing that he was not depressed and had no serious problems in his life that might have led him to attempt suicide. He had been on medication for hypertension and diabetes. Agbobli was married to the Angolan Ambassador to Poland and had travelled to Warsaw not long before his death.

== See also ==
- 1994 Togolese parliamentary election
- Elections in Togo
- 2007 Togolese parliamentary election
