= St. Peter and St. Paul Cathedral, Abeokuta =

Church in Abeokuta, Nigeria

Cathedral of Ss. Peter and Paul
- Abeokuta Cathedral
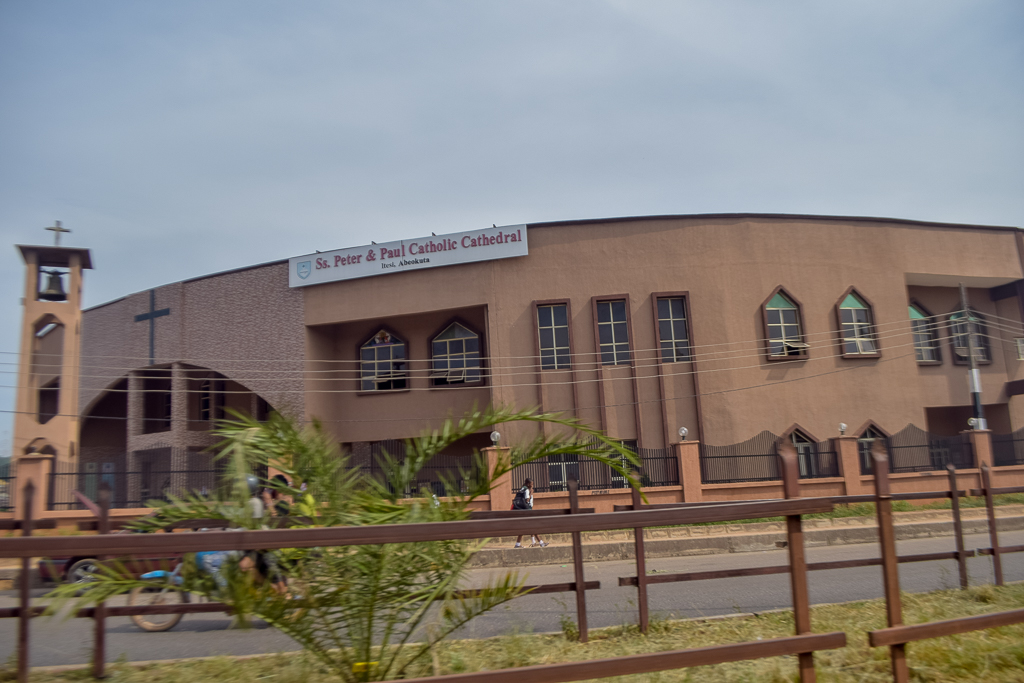
- Cathedral of Ss. Peter and Paul
- Location: Abeokuta
- Country: Nigeria
- Denomination: Catholic Church
- Sui iuris church: Latin Church

History
- Founded: 1880

The Cathedral of Saints Peter and Paul is a cathedral of the Catholic Church, located in Abeokuta, capital of Ogun State, Nigeria. It is the seat of the Diocese of Abeokuta (Dioecesis Abeokutanus).

Catholicism was introduced to Abeokuta by the Fathers of the Society of African Missions (SMA) around 1880, with the first Mass celebrated on June 29, 1880, the feast day of Saints Peter and Saint Paul. The church was elevated to cathedral status in 1997 when Pope John Paul II created the diocese with the bull Cum ad aeternam.

== See also ==
- Catholic Church in Nigeria
