= Diocese of Dapaong =

Roman Catholic diocese in Togo

Coordinates: 10.8635°N 0.2061°E

Diocese of Dapaong Dioecesis Dapaonganus

Location
- Country: Togo
- Metropolitan: Lomé

Statistics
- Area: 8,533 km^{2} (3,295 sq mi)
- Population: Total; Catholics: (as of 2004); 597,180; 147,716 (24.7%)

Information
- Rite: Latin Rite

Current leadership
- Pope: Leo XIV
- Bishop: Dominique Banlène Guigbile
- Bishops emeritus: Jacques Tukumbé Nyimbusède Anyilunda

The Roman Catholic Diocese of Dapaong (Latin: Dapaongan(us)) is a diocese located in the city of Dapaong in the ecclesiastical province of Lomé in Togo.

== History ==
- March 1, 1960: Established as Apostolic Prefecture of Dapango from the Diocese of Sokodé
- July 6, 1965: Promoted as Diocese of Dapango
- December 3, 1990: Renamed as Diocese of Dapaong

== Special churches ==
The Cathedral is Cathédrale Saint Charles Lwanga in Dapaong.

== Leadership ==
- Prefect Apostolic of Dapango (Roman rite)
  - Fr. Barthélemy-Pierre-Joseph Hanrion, O.F.M. (1960.03.29 – 1965.07.06 see below)
- Bishop of Dapango (Roman rite)
  - Bishop Barthélemy-Pierre-Joseph Hanrion, O.F.M. (see above 1965.07.06 – 1984.09.18)
- Bishops of Dapaong (Roman rite)
  - Bishop Jacques Tukumbé Nyimbusède Anyilunda (1990.12.03 - 2016.11.15)
  - Bishop Dominique Banlène Guigbile (since 2016.11.15)

== See also ==
- Roman Catholicism in Togo

== Sources ==
- GCatholic.org
- Catholic Hierarchy
