= Saint-Pierre, Bas-Rhin =

Saint-Pierre
- Commune
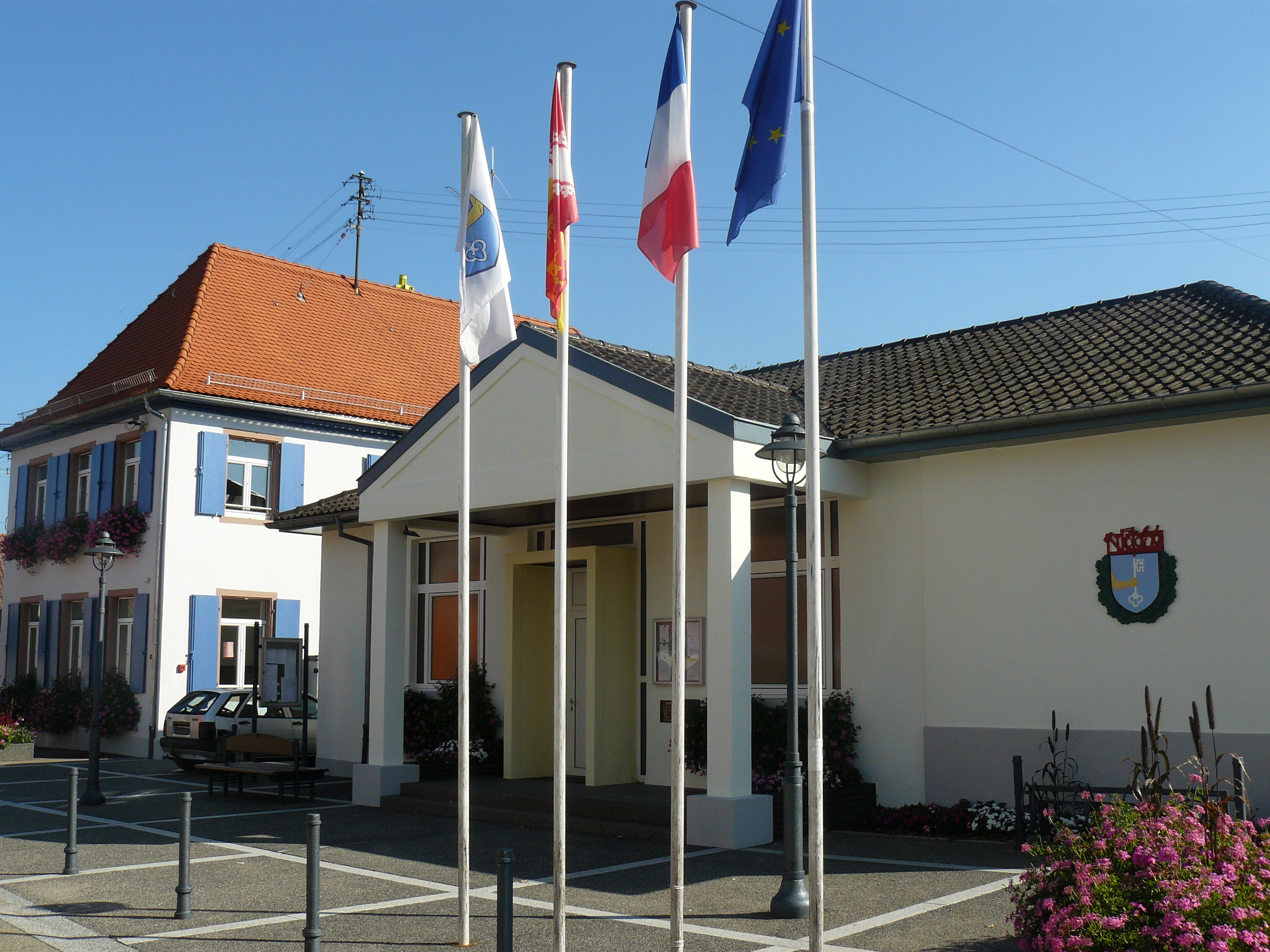
- The town hall in Saint-Pierre

- Flag Coat of arms
- Location of Saint-Pierre
- Location within France Location within Grand Est
- Coordinates: 48°23′05″N 7°28′18″E
- Country: France
- Region: Grand Est
- Department: Bas-Rhin
- Arrondissement: Sélestat-Erstein
- Canton: Obernai

Government
  - Mayor (2020–2026): Denis Ruxer
- Area^{1}: 3.21 km^{2} (1.24 sq mi)
- Highest elevation: 208 m (682 ft)
- Lowest elevation: 169 m (554 ft)
- Population (2023): 614
  - Density: 191/km^{2} (495/sq mi)
- Time zone: UTC+01:00 (CET)
  - Summer (DST): UTC+02:00 (CEST)
- INSEE/Postal code: 67429 /67140
- ^{1} French Land Register data, which excludes lakes, ponds, glaciers > 1 km^{2} (0.386 sq mi or 247 acres) and river estuaries.

Saint-Pierre (French pronunciation: [sɛ̃ pjɛʁ]; German: Sankt Peter; Alemannic: Sàm-Peeter) is a commune in the Bas-Rhin department, Alsace, north-eastern France.

== See also ==
- Communes of the Bas-Rhin department
