= Cathedral of Saints Peter and Paul, Petergof =

Cathedral in Petergof, Russia

Coordinates: 59.87895°N 29.91274°E

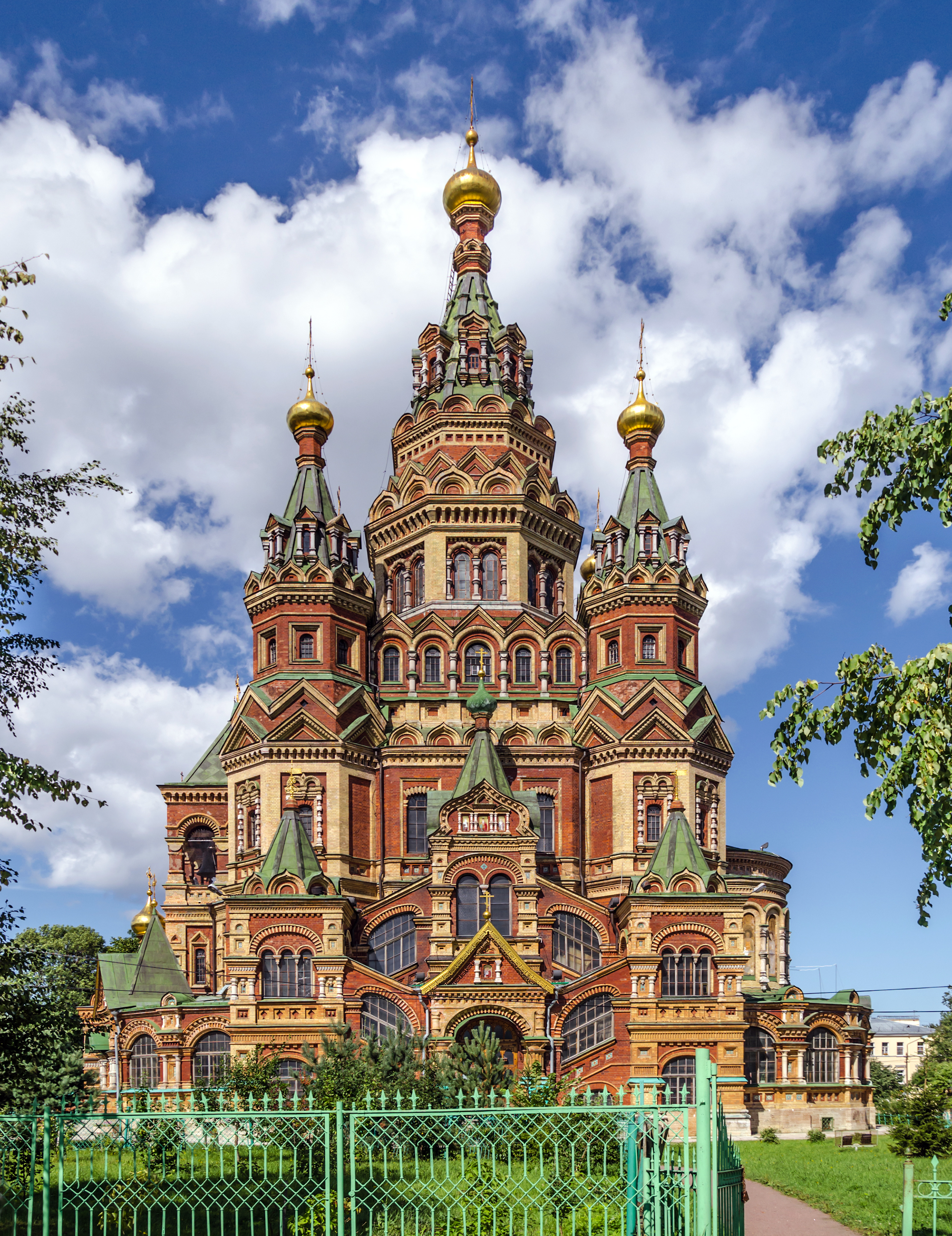

The Cathedral of Saints Peter and Paul (Russian: Собо́р Свя́тых Петра́ и Па́вла) is a Russian Orthodox cathedral located in Petergof, Russia (also known as Peterhof).

Emperor Alexander III approved the design for the cathedral in 1893. It was designed by civil engineer Nikolai Sultanov in the Russian Revival style. It was completed in 1905 but was closed in 1935 and seriously damaged in World War II when it was used to house artillery by German troops. The cathedral was eventually restored and services in the space resumed in 1990.
