= Saints Peter and Paul Cathedral, Kazan =

Cathedral in Kazan, Russia

Coordinates: 55°47′37″N 49°06′48″E

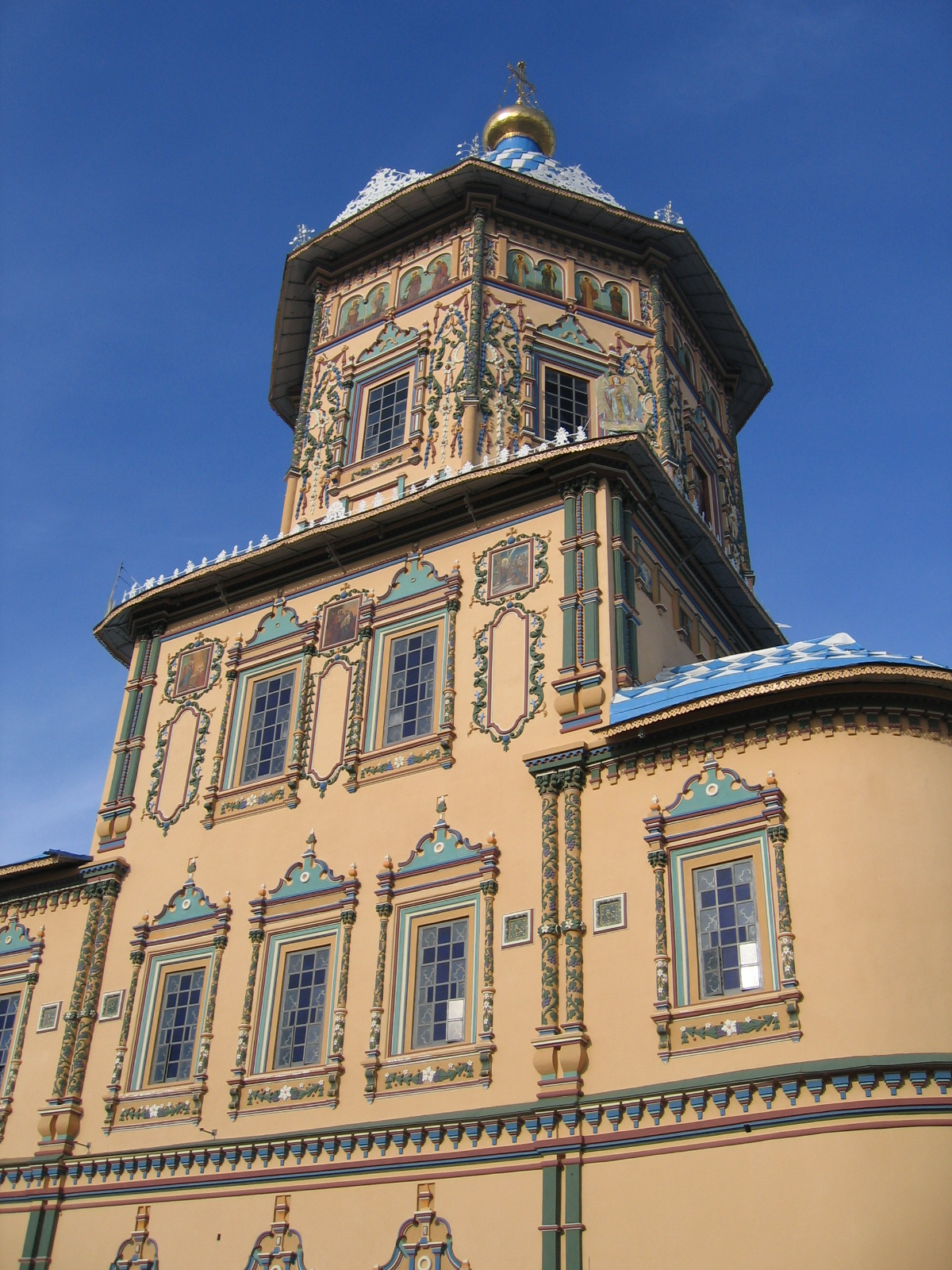
Saints Peter and Paul Cathedral in Kazan

Saints Peter and Paul Cathedral (Petropavlovsky Cathedral, Russian: Петропавловский собор) is a Russian Orthodox church in Kazan (Tatarstan). It is one of the most famous churches in Naryshkin Baroque.

The temple was consecrated in honour of heavenly Tsar Peter I of Russia patron.

Saints Peter and Paul Cathedral was built in 1722. Construction was commissioned by the merchant Ivan Afanasievich Mikhlyaev, the head of the imperial factories in Kazan. Most likely, its oriental-like cathedral and its bell tower were constructed by Moscow and Kazan masters.
