= Diocese of Aného =

Diocese of the Catholic Church in Togo

Coordinates: 6.2314°N 1.5932°E

Diocese of Aného Dioecesis Anehensis

Location
- Country: Togo
- Metropolitan: Lomé

Statistics
- Area: 2,712 km^{2} (1,047 sq mi)
- Population: Total; Catholics: (as of 2004); 813,203; 174,346 (21.4%)

Information
- Rite: Latin Rite

Current leadership
- Pope: Leo XIV
- Bishop: Vacant

The Roman Catholic Diocese of Aného (Latin: Anehen(sis)) is a diocese located in the city of Aného in the ecclesiastical province of Lomé in Togo.

== History ==
- July 1, 1994: Established as Diocese of Aného from the Metropolitan Archdiocese of Lomé

== Special churches ==
The Cathedral is Cathédrale Saints Pierre et Paul in Aného

== Leadership ==
- Bishops of Aného (Roman rite)
  - Bishop Victor Dovi Hounnaké (1 July 1994 – 4 August 1995)
  - Bishop Paul Jean-Marie Dossavi (23 February 1996 – 13 September 2005)
  - Bishop Isaac Jogues Agbémenya Kodjo Gaglo (3 December 2007 – 10 April 2026)

== See also ==
- Roman Catholicism in Togo

== Sources ==
- GCatholic.org
- Catholic Hierarchy
