= Saint-Gall de Ouidah Major Seminary =

The Saint-Gall de Ouidah Major Seminary (French: Grand Séminaire Saint-Gall de Ouidah) is a Roman Catholic Seminary in Ouidah, a Voodoo centre in the south of Benin. It is a training center for priests in Benin, and has hosted number of seminarians not only from Benin, but also Togo, Ivory Coast, Senegal, Niger, and Burkina Faso, including the Beninese politician Albert Tévoédjrè.

== Location ==
The seminary is located on a hill a few kilometers north of Ouidah, and is surrounded by fruit orchards.

== History ==
In 1899, Father François Steinmetz - an SMA priest and future bishop - established a farm near the city to feed the population and increase their resources. He planted thousands of coffee bushes, coconut and oil palms. In 1910, he decided to found a seminary there, and the first building, in colonial architecture, was inaugurated in 1914. An extension was soon necessary and in 1929 the Diocese of St Gallen in Switzerland was given the responsibility of constructing a major seminary which bore its name. Further enlargements followed and the central building, with a bell tower, was completed in 1930.

This new seminary was inaugurated on July 20, 1930 and the first intake had 36 students. Given the status of regional seminary in 1952, it was run by the Priests of Saint-Sulpice from 1955 to 1971 and played a role in the socio-economic development of the French colony of Dahomey which became independent during this time. The running of the seminary was handed over to African clergy in 1971. In 2011 the seminary welcomed 147 seminarians, and was run by 13 diocesan priests, including two Sulpicians who live in community with them.

In 2014 the seminar celebrated its centenary.

On November 19, 2019, during his apostolic trip to Benin, Pope Benedict XVI prayed at the tomb of a former seminarian, cardinal Bernardin Gantin, who is buried in the chapel.
