= Bacanaria =

The diocese of Bacanaria (Latin: Dioecesis Bacanariensis) is a suppressed and titular see of the Roman Catholic Church.

The bishopric was founded in late antiquity, although the seat of its cathedra is unknown Bacanaria, it was registered in the Roman province of Mauretania Caesariensis so somewhere in today's Algeria. There is only one ancient bishop of this place known to us, Palladius Bacanariensis, known from the list of Catholic bishops called to Carthage in 484 by King Huneric the Vandal. As an Arian Christian, Huneric persecuted the Catholics in his realm, and Palladius was exiled from North Africa.

Today Bacanaria survives as a titular bishopric.
