= Diocese of Atakpamé =

Roman Catholic diocese in Togo

Coordinates: 7.5211°N 1.1390°E

Diocese of Atakpamé Dioecesis Atakpamensis

Location
- Country: Togo
- Metropolitan: Lomé

Statistics
- Area: 13,453 km^{2} (5,194 sq mi)
- Population: Total; Catholics: (as of 2006); 699,540; 257,168 (36.8%)

Information
- Rite: Latin Rite

Current leadership
- Pope: Leo XIV
- Bishop: Moïse Messan Touho

The Roman Catholic Diocese of Atakpamé (Latin: Atakpamen(sis)) is a diocese located in the city of Atakpamé in the ecclesiastical province of Lomé in Togo.

== History ==
- 29 September 1964: Established as Diocese of Atakpamé from the Metropolitan Archdiocese of Lomé

== Bishops ==
- Bishops of Atakpamé (Roman rite)
  - Bishop Bernard Oguki-Atakpah (29 September 1964 – 1976)
  - Bishop Philippe Fanoko Kossi Kpodzro (10 April 1976 – 17 December 1992), appointed Archbishop of Lomé
  - Bishop Julien Mawule Kouto (18 October 1993 – 1 March 2006)
  - Bishop Nicodème Anani Barrigah-Benissan (9 January 2008 - 23 November 2019), appointed Archbishop of Lomé
  - Bishop Moise Touho (26 October 2022 -)

=== Another priest of this diocese who became bishop ===
- Célestin-Marie Gaoua, appointed Bishop of Sokodé in 2016

== See also ==
- Roman Catholicism in Togo

== Sources ==
- Catholic Hierarchy Information
