= Denis Komivi Amuzu-Dzakpah =

Togolese Catholic bishop (born 1943)

- Archbishop Emeritus of Lomé
- Church: Catholic Church
- Archdiocese: Archdiocese of Lomé
- In office: 8 June 2007 – 23 November 2019
- Predecessor: Philippe Fanoko Kpodzro
- Successor: Nicodème Barrigah-Benissan

Orders
- Ordination: 22 May 1972 by Julius August Döpfner
- Consecration: 15 August 2007 by Christian Tumi

Personal details
- Born: 10 October 1943 (age 82) Kpogame (northeast of Lomé), French mandate for Togoland, French West Africa, French Empire
- Coat of arms

Denis Komivi Amuzu-Dzakpah (born 10 October 1943) is a Togolese Catholic bishop.

He was ordained a Priest of Lomé on 22 May 1972. He was appointed Archbishop of Lomé on 8 June 2007, and he was ordained bishop on 15 August 2007.

Pope Francis accepted his resignation on 23 November 2019.

Catholic Church titles
Preceded by Philippe Fanoko Kpodzro	Archbishop of Lomé; 2007-2019	Succeeded by Nicodème Barrigah-Benissan
