= Diocese of Kpalimé =

Roman Catholic diocese in Togo

Coordinates: 6.9058°N 0.6295°E

Diocese of Kpalimé Dioecesis Kpalimensis Diocèse de Kpalimé
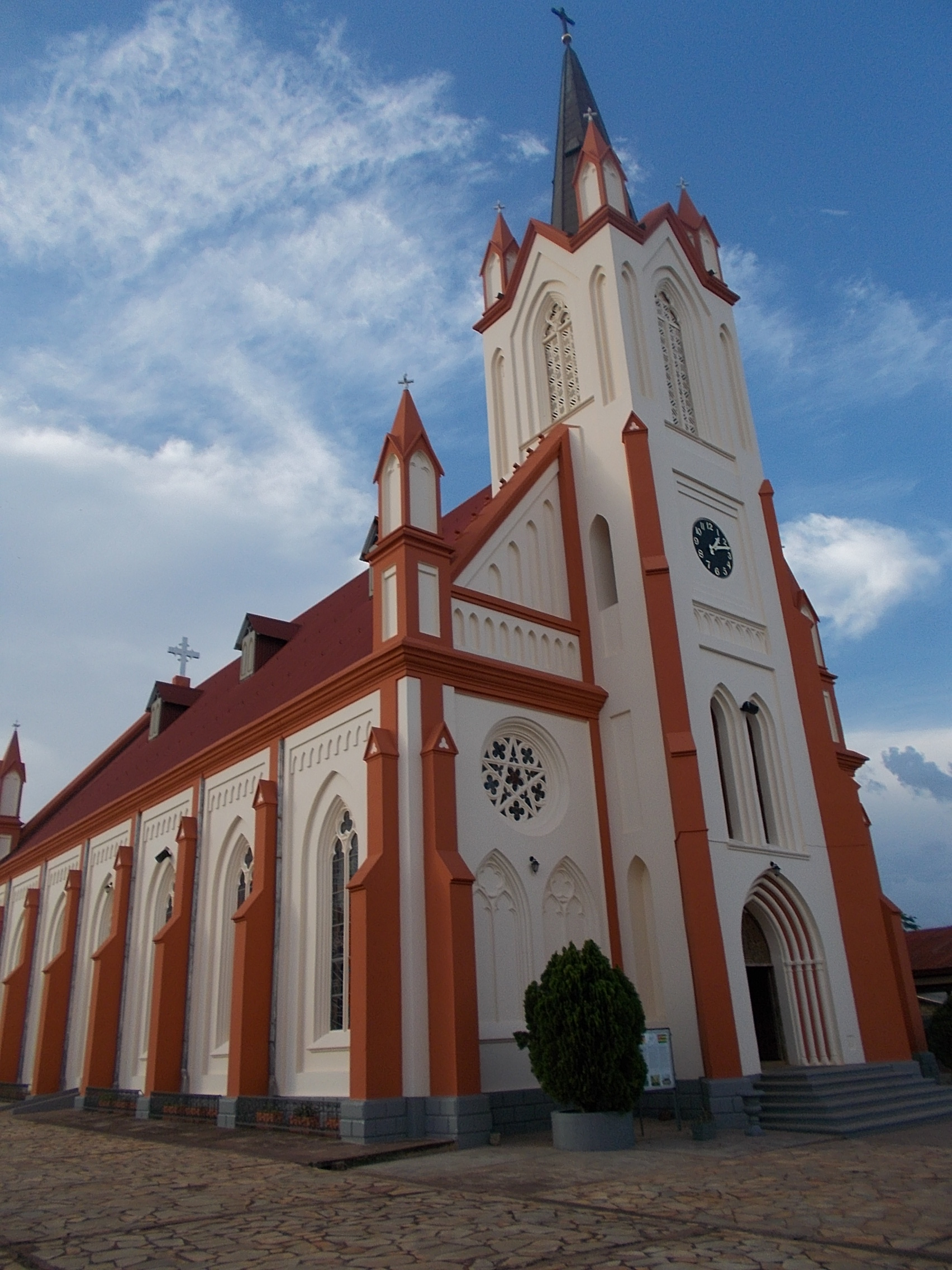
- Cathédrale de Kpalimé vue de Coté

Location
- Country: Togo
- Metropolitan: Archdiocese of Lomé
- Headquarters: Kpalimé, Plateaux Region, Togo

Statistics
- Area: 6,447 km^{2} (2,489 sq mi)
- Population: Total; Catholics: (as of 2023); 905,225; 396,544 (43.8%)
- Parishes: 68

Information
- Denomination: Catholic Church
- Sui iuris church: Latin Church
- Rite: Roman Rite
- Established: 1 July 1994; 32 years ago
- Cathedral: Holy Spirit Cathedral, Kpalimé
- Secular priests: 167 (141 Diocesan, 26 Religious Orders)

Current leadership
- Pope: Leo XIV
- Bishop: Edmond Yawo Amekuse
- Metropolitan Archbishop: Isaac Jogues Agbémenya Kodjo Gaglo
- Bishops emeritus: Benoît Comlan Messan Alowonou

The Roman Catholic Diocese of Kpalimé (Latin: Kpalimen(sis)) is a diocese located in the city of Kpalimé in the ecclesiastical province of Lomé in Togo.

== History ==
- 1 July 1994: Established as Diocese of Kpalimé from the Metropolitan Archdiocese of Lomé

== Special churches ==
The Cathedral is the Cathédrale Saint-Esprit in Kpalimé.

== Leadership ==
=== Bishops of Kpalimé ===
- Pierre Koffi Séshie (1 July 1994 – 25 April 2000)
- Benoît Comlan Messan Alowonou (4 July 2001 – 26 June 2026), retired
- Edmond Yawo Amekuse (26 June 2026 – Present)

== See also ==
- Roman Catholicism in Togo

== Sources ==
- GCatholic.org
- Catholic Hierarchy
