= Robert-Casimir Dosseh-Anyron =

- Archbishop of Lomé
- Church: Catholic Church
- Archdiocese: Archdiocese of Lomé
- In office: 10 March 1962 – 13 February 1992
- Predecessor: Joseph-Paul Strebler
- Successor: Philippe Fanoko Kpodzro

Orders
- Ordination: 21 December 1951
- Consecration: 10 June 1962 by Julius August Döpfner

Personal details
- Born: Robert-Casimir Tonyui Messan Dosseh-Anyron; 13 October 1925 Vogan, Mandatory French Togoland, French West Africa, French Empire
- Died: 15 April 2014 (aged 88)

Robert-Casimir Tonyui Messan Dosseh-Anyron (13 October 1925 – 15 April 2014) was a Togolese Catholic archbishop. He was ordained a priest of Lomé on 21 December 1951. He became Archbishop of Lomé on 10 June 1962, a position which he served until his resignation on 13 February 1992.

Catholic Church titles
Preceded by Joseph-Paul Strebler	Archbishop of Lomé; 1962-1992	Succeeded by Philippe Fanoko Kpodzro
