= Diocese of Kara =

Roman Catholic diocese in Togo

Coordinates: 9.5526°N 1.1885°E

Diocese of Kara Dioecesis Karaensis
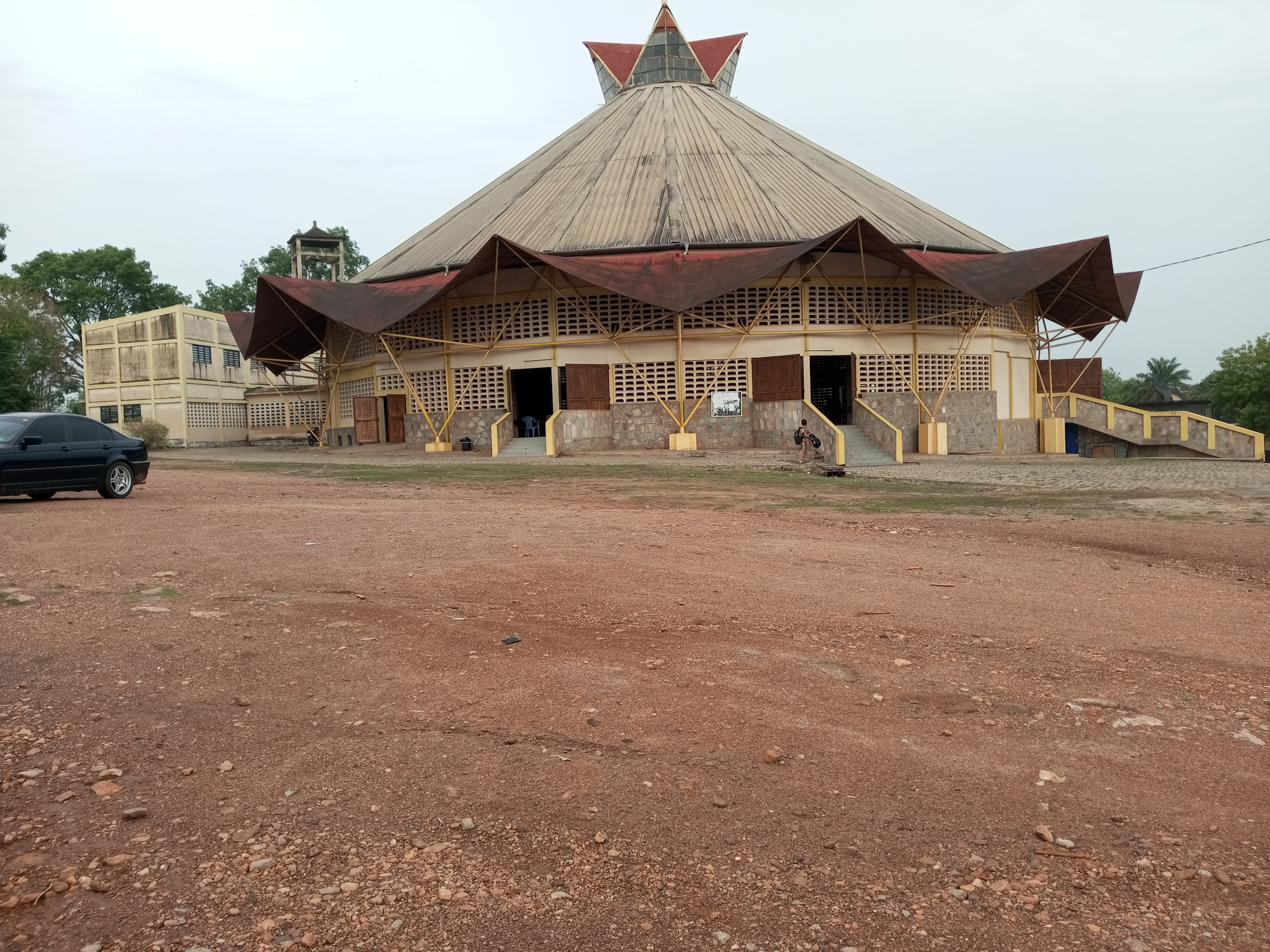
- Cathédral St Pierre et Paul de Kara

Location
- Country: Togo
- Metropolitan: Lomé

Statistics
- Area: 10,590 km^{2} (4,090 sq mi)
- Population: Total; Catholics: (as of 2004); 878,500; 117,470 (13.4%)

Information
- Rite: Latin Rite

Current leadership
- Pope: Leo XIV
- Bishop: Jacques Danka Longa

The Roman Catholic Diocese of Kara (Latin: Karaën(sis)) is a diocese located in the city of Kara in the ecclesiastical province of Lomé in Togo.

== History ==
- July 1, 1994: Established as Diocese of Kara from the Diocese of Sokodé

== Leadership ==
- Bishops of Kara (Roman rite)
  - Bishop Ernest Patili Assi (July 1, 1994 – February 16, 1996)
  - Bishop Ignace Baguibassa Sambar-Talkena (November 30, 1996 - January 7, 2009)
  - Bishop Jacques Danka Longa (January 7, 2009 – present), had previously been Coadjutor Bishop of the diocese (2008-2009)

== Twinning ==
The diocese of Kara is twinned with the Diocese of Bayonne, Lescar and Oloron.

== See also ==
- Roman Catholicism in Togo

== Sources ==
- GCatholic.org
- Catholic Hierarchy
