= Diocese of Sokodé =

Roman Catholic diocese in Togo

Coordinates: 8.9831°N 1.1453°E

Diocese of Sokodé Dioecesis Sokodensis

Location
- Country: Togo
- Metropolitan: Lomé

Statistics
- Area: 12,610 km^{2} (4,870 sq mi)
- Population: Total; Catholics: (as of 2014); 1,136,000; 153,021 (13.5%)

Information
- Rite: Latin Rite

Current leadership
- Pope: Leo XIV
- Bishop: Celestin-Marie Gaoua

The Roman Catholic Diocese of Sokodé (Latin: Sokoden(sis)) is a diocese located in the city of Sokodé in the ecclesiastical province of Lomé in Togo.

== History ==
- May 18, 1937: Established as Apostolic Prefecture of Sokodé from the Apostolic Vicariate of Togo
- September 14, 1955: Promoted as Diocese of Sokodé

== Special churches ==
The Cathedral is the Cathédrale Sainte Thérèse in Sokodé.

== Bishops ==
=== Ordinaries ===
- Prefects Apostolic of Sokodé (Roman rite)
  - Fr. Joseph-Paul Strebler, S.M.A. (1937.05 – 1945.11.08), appointed Vicar Apostolic of Lomé; future Archbishop
  - Fr. Jérôme-Théodore Lingenheim, S.M.A. (1946.06.07 – 1955.09.14 see below)
- Bishops of Sokodé (Roman rite)
  - Bishop Jérôme-Théodore Lingenheim, S.M.A. (-see above 1955.09.14 – 1964.11.18)
  - Bishop Chrétien Matawo Bakpessi (1965.08.09 – 1992.04.27)
  - Bishop Ambroise Kotamba Djoliba (1993.04.05 - 2016.01.03)
  - Bishop Celestin-Marie Gaoua (2016.01.03 - )

=== Another priest of this diocese who became bishop ===
- Jacques Danka Longa (priest here, 1992-1994), appointed Coadjutor Bishop of Kara in 2008

== See also ==
- Roman Catholicism in Togo

== Sources ==
- GCatholic.org
- Catholic Hierarchy
