= Philippe Fanoko Kpodzro =

Togolese Roman Catholic archbishop (1930–2024)

His Excellency Philippe Fanoko Kpodzro
- Archbishop Emeritus of Lomé
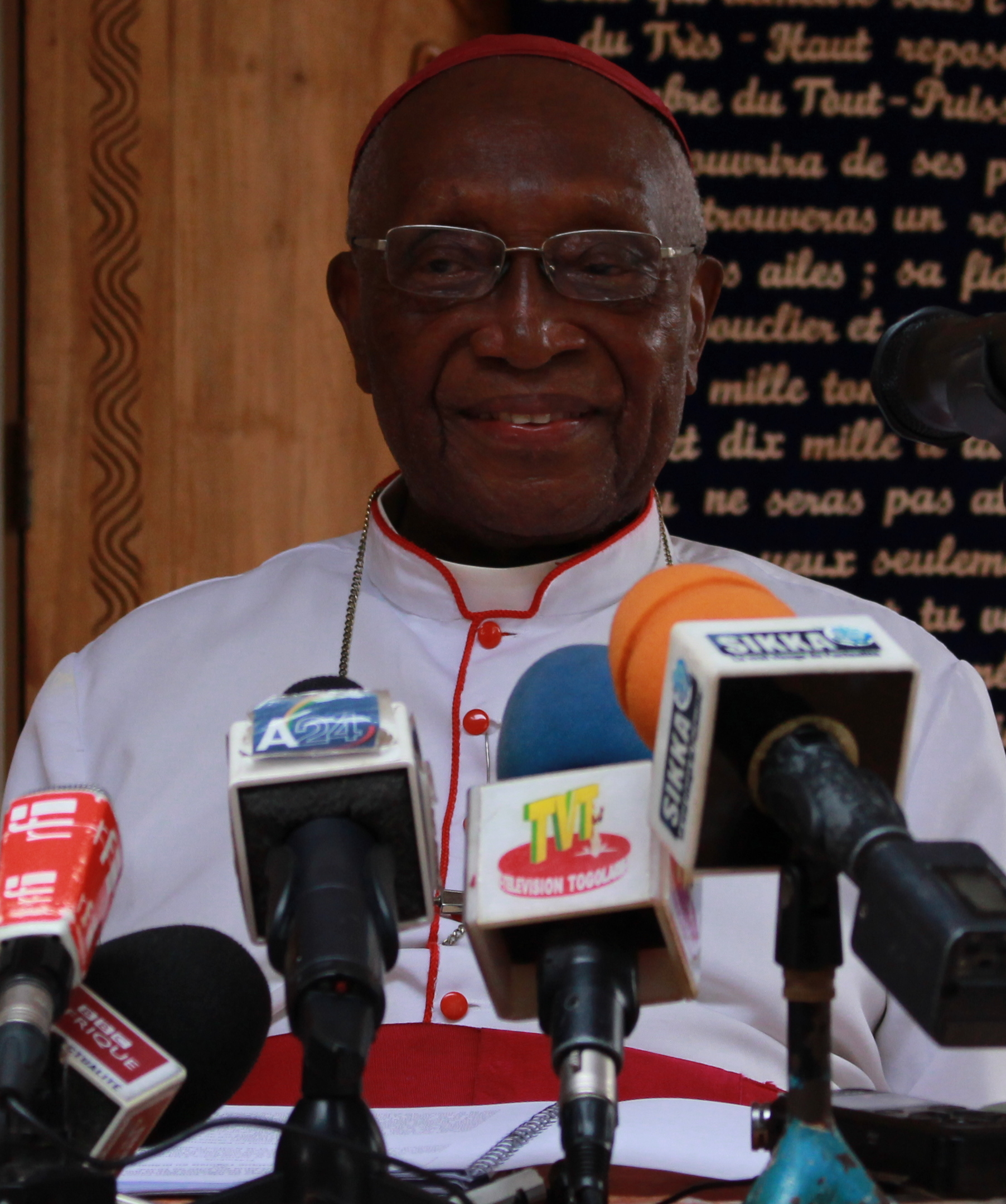
- Kpodzro in 2018
- Diocese: Lomé
- Appointed: 17 December 1992
- Term ended: 8 June 2007
- Predecessor: Robert-Casimir Dosseh-Anyron
- Successor: Denis Komivi Amuzu-Dzakpah
- Previous posts: Titular Bishop of Bacanaria (1975–1976); Bishop of Atakpamé (1976–1992)

Orders
- Ordination: 20 December 1959
- Consecration: 2 May 1976 by Paul Zoungrana

Personal details
- Born: 30 March 1930 Tamegbé, French Togoland, French West Africa
- Died: 9 January 2024 (aged 93)

Philippe Fanoko Kossi Kpodzro (30 March 1930 – 9 January 2024) was a Togolese Roman Catholic prelate. He was ordained a priest on 20 December 1959 in Rome, later ordained Bishop of Atakpamé on 2 May 1976. He was born in Tomégbé. He was Archbishop of Lomé between 17 December 1992 and 8 June 2007.

Kpodzro was the president of the National Assembly of Togo from 1991 to 1994. In January 2020, he called for the suspension of the 2020 Togolese presidential election in order to pave the way for electoral reforms. Kpodzro died on 9 January 2024, at the age of 93.

Catholic Church titles
Preceded by Robert-Casimir Dosseh-Anyron	Archbishop of Lomé; 1992–2007	Succeeded by Denis Komivi Amuzu-Dzakpah
Preceded by Bernard Oguki-Atakpah	Bishop of Atakpamé; 1976–1992	Succeeded by Julien Mawule Kouto
Preceded by James Chiona	Titular Bishop of Bacanaria; 1975–1976	Succeeded by Teodoro Javier Buhain Jr.
