= Archdiocese of Lomé =

Roman Catholic archdiocese in Togo

Coordinates: 6.1249°N 1.2263°E

Metropolitan Archdiocese of Lomé Archidioecesis Lomensis
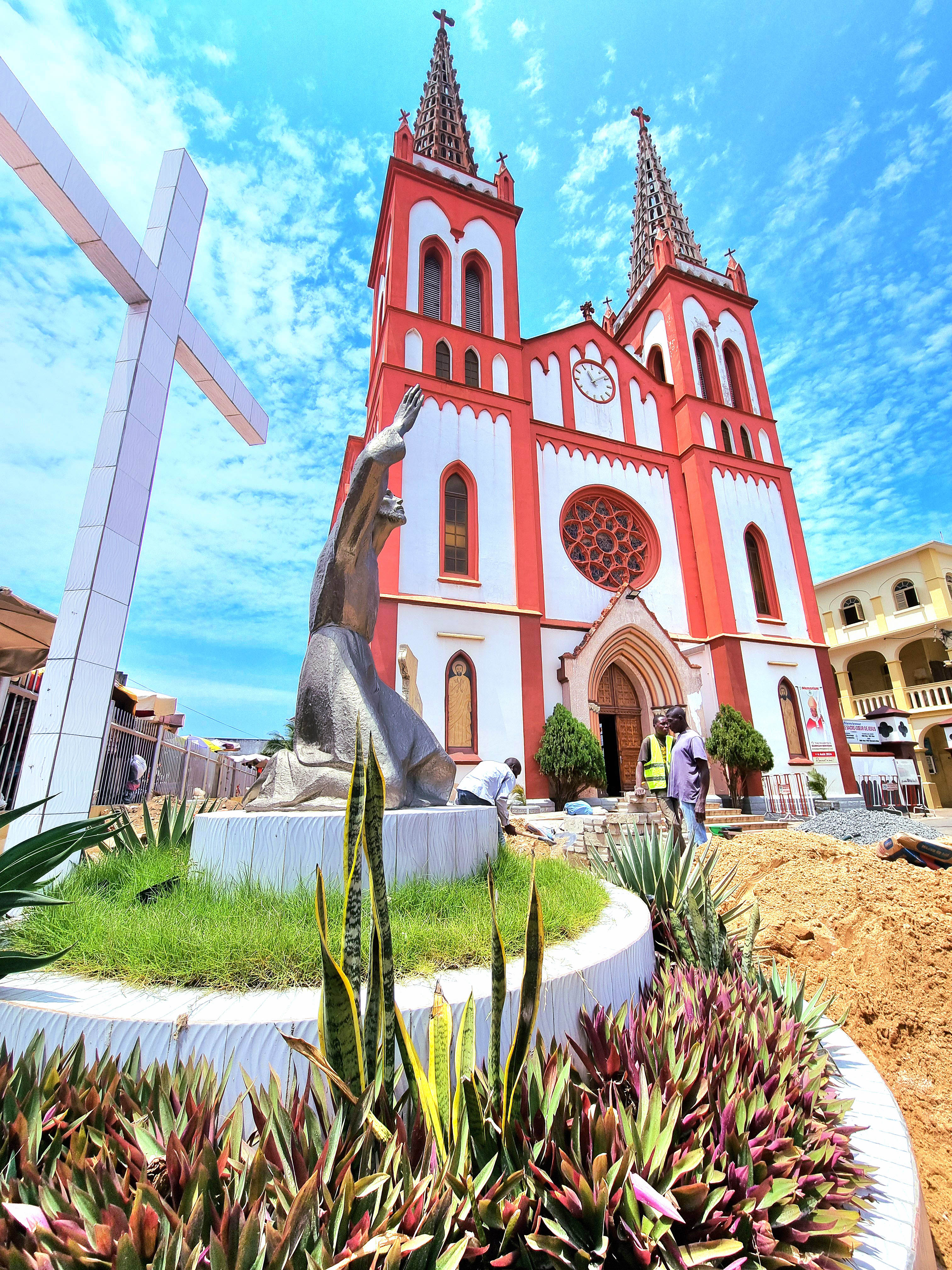
- Cathedral of the Archdiocese

Location
- Country: Togo

Statistics
- Area: 3,682 km^{2} (1,422 sq mi)
- Population: Total; Catholics: (as of 2023); 2,245,375; 668,580 (39.8%)
- Parishes: 76

Information
- Denomination: Catholic
- Sui iuris church: Latin Church
- Rite: Roman Rite
- Established: April 12, 1892; 134 years ago
- Cathedral: Sacred Heart Cathedral, Lomé
- Secular priests: 379

Current leadership
- Pope: Leo XIV
- Archbishop: Isaac Jogues Agbémenya Kodjo Gaglo
- Bishops emeritus: Denis Komivi Amuzu-Dzakpah

Website
- www.archidiocesedelome.tg

The Roman Catholic Archdiocese of Lomé (Latin: Lomen(sis)) is the Metropolitan See for the ecclesiastical province of Lomé in Togo.

== History ==
- April 12, 1892: Established as Apostolic Prefecture of Togo from the Apostolic Prefecture of Dahomey in Benin
- March 16, 1914: Promoted as Apostolic Vicariate of Togo
- June 14, 1938: Renamed as Apostolic Vicariate of Lomé
- September 14, 1955: Promoted as Metropolitan Archdiocese of Lomé

== Special churches ==
The seat of the archbishop is the Cathédrale du Sacré-Cœur in Lomé.

== Leadership ==
=== Ordinaries ===
Vicar Apostolic of Togo

- Franz Wolf, S.V.D. (1914.03.16 – 1922.11.24)

Vicars Apostolic of Lomé

- Jean-Marie Cessou, S.M.A. (1923.03.22 – 1945.03.03)
- Joseph-Paul Strebler, S.M.A. (1945.11.08 – 1955.09.14 see below)

Metropolitan Archbishops of Lomé

- Joseph-Paul Strebler, S.M.A. (see above 1955.09.14 – 1961.06.16)
- Robert-Casimir Tonyui Messan Dosseh-Anyron (1962.03.10 – 1992.02.13)
- Philippe Fanoko Kossi Kpodzro (1992.12.17 - 2007.06.08)
- Denis Komivi Amuzu-Dzakpah (2007.08.15 - 2019.11.23)
- Nicodème Anani Barrigah-Benissan (2019.11.23 - 2024.08.04)
- Isaac Jogues Agbémenya Kodjo Gaglo (since 10 April 2026)

=== Priests of this diocese who became bishop ===
- Isaac Jogues Agbémenya Kodjo Gaglo, appointed Bishop of Aného in 2007

== Suffragan dioceses ==
- Aného
- Atakpamé
- Dapaong
- Kara
- Kpalimé
- Sokodé

== See also ==
List of Roman Catholic dioceses in Togo

== Sources ==
- Archdiocese of Lomé at Catholic-Hierarchy.org
