= St. Peter and St. Paul's Church =

St. Peter and St. Paul's Church, and variations using Saint or Saints or other, may refer to one of many churches dedicated to the apostles Saint Peter and Saint Paul around the world, including:

== Armenia ==
- Saint Paul and Peter Church, Yerevan (destroyed in the 1930s)

== Australia ==
- St Peter and St Paul Russian Orthodox Cathedral, Strathfield, in Sydney

== Belarus ==
- Sts. Apostles Peter and Paul Church and Basilian Monastery in Hlybokaye
- Saints Peter and Paul Church, Iwye

== Belgium ==
- Sint-Petrus-en-Pauluskerk, Ostend

== Bosnia and Herzegovina ==
- Saints Peter and Paul Church, Livno
- Church of St. Peter and Paul, Mostar

== Bulgaria ==
- Church of Saints Peter and Paul, Nikopol

== Canada ==
- Saints Peter and Paul Melkite Catholic Church, in Ottawa
- St. Peter & St. Paul's Anglican Church (Ottawa)

== Croatia ==
- Church of St. Peter and Paul, Bolman
- Church of St. Peter and Paul, Orolik
- Church of St Peter and St Paul, Osijek, co-cathedral of the Roman Catholic Archdiocese of Đakovo-Osijek
- Church of the Holy Apostles Peter and Paul, Štikada, Serbian Orthodox Church
- Church of St. Peter and Paul, Tepljuh
- Church of St. Peter and Paul, Topolje

== Cyprus ==
- Church of St. Peter and St. Paul of Famagusta, art gallery and showroom

== Czech Republic ==
- Cathedral of St. Peter and Paul, Brno
- Church of Saint Peter and Paul, Karlovy Vary
- Basilica of St. Peter and St. Paul, Prague

== Egypt ==
- St. Peter and St. Paul's Church, Cairo

== Estonia ==
- St. Peter and St. Paul's Church, Kaarma
- St. Peter and St. Paul's Cathedral, Tallinn

== France ==
- Church of St. Peter and St. Paul (Montreuil, Seine-Saint-Denis)
- Église Saint-Pierre-et-Saint-Paul, Neuwiller-lès-Saverne
- St. Peter and St. Paul's Church, Wissembourg

== Georgia ==
- St. Peter and St. Paul's Church, Tbilisi

== Germany ==
- Church of St. Peter and St. Paul, Angermünde, Brandenburg
- St. Peter and Paul Cathedral, Brandenburg
- Basilica of Sts. Peter and Paul, Dillingen
- Peter and Paul Church, Potsdam
- Basilica of Sts. Peter and Paul, Reichenau
- Ss. Peter and Paul, Wannsee in Berlin
- St. Peter und Paul, Weimar

== India ==
- St. Peter and St. Paul's Church, Parumala
- St. Peter and St. Paul's Church, Kolenchery

== Iran ==
- Sts. Peter and Paul Church, Urmia

== Ireland ==
- Church of Saints Peter and Paul, Athlone
- Saints Peter and Paul's Church, Cork
- St Peter and St Paul Cathedral, Ennis, County Clare

== Israel ==
- St. Peter and St. Paul Church, Shefa-Amr

== Italy ==
- Church of St. Peter and Paul, Arese
- St. Peter and St. Paul's Church, Brebbia
- Santi Pietro e Paolo, Buonconvento
- Santi Pietro e Paolo d'Agrò, Casalvecchio Siculo
- Chiesa dei Santi Apostoli Pietro e Paolo, Chioggia
- San Pietro Caveoso, Matera
- Santi Pietro e Paolo, Siena

== Kosovo ==
- Church of the Holy Apostles Peter and Paul, Suva Reka

== Lithuania ==
- St. Peter and St. Paul's Church, Panevėžys
- Church of St. Peter and St. Paul, Plateliai
- Church of St. Peter and St. Paul, Ukmergė
- St. Peter and St. Paul's Church, Vilnius

== Luxembourg ==
- St. Peter and Paul Church, Luxembourg

== Netherlands ==
- Church of St. Peter and St. Paul, Amsterdam

== Oman ==
- Sts. Peter and Paul Church, Muscat

== Papua New Guinea ==
- Sts Peter and Paul Cathedral, Dogura

== Philippines ==
- Saints Peter and Paul Parish Church (Calasiao), Pangasinan
- Sts. Peter and Paul Parish Church (Makati)
- Saints Peter and Paul Parish Church (Siniloan), Laguna

== Poland ==
- Sts. Apostles Peter and Paul Church (Brzeg)
- Sts. Peter and Paul Church (Bydgoszcz)
- Sts. Apostles Peter and Paul Church (Kraków)
- Sts. Peter and Paul Collegiate Basilica in Kruszwica, Kuyavian-Pomeranian Voivodship
- Sts. Peter and Paul Church (Pabianice)
- Sts. Apostles Peter and Paul Archcathedral Basilica in Poznań
- Sts. Apostles Peter and Paul Church (Prudnik)
- Sts. Apostles Peter and Paul Church (Siematycze)
- Sts. Apostles Peter and Paul Church (Sosnowica)
- Sts. Apostles Peter and Paul Basilica (Strzegom)
- Sts. Peter and St. Paul Church (Szczecin)
- Sts. Apostles Peter and Paul Church (Downtown, Warsaw)
- Sts. Apostles Peter and Paul Church (Ursynów) in Warsaw

== Romania ==
- Bărboi Monastery
- Cathedral of Saints Peter and Paul, Constanța
- Saints Peter and Paul Church, Pitești
- Saints Peter and Paul Church, Târgu Jiu

== Russia ==
- Church of the Holy Apostles Peter and Paul, Neivo-Shaitansky
- Saints Peter and Paul Cathedral, Saint Petersburg
- Church of the Holy Apostles Peter and Paul, Shadrinka
- Lutheran Church of Saint Peter and Saint Paul, Saint Petersburg
- Lutheran Church of Saint Peter and Saint Paul (Yaroslavl)

== Serbia ==
- Church of the Holy Apostles Peter and Paul, Ras, an early Christian church
- Church of the Holy Apostles Peter and Paul, Topčider
- Church of the Holy Apostles Peter and Paul, Kriva Reka

== Singapore ==
- Church of Saints Peter and Paul, Singapore

== Slovenia ==
- Church of St. Peter and Paul, Miliči

== Switzerland ==
- Church of St. Peter and Paul, Bern

== Turkey ==
- Church of SS Peter and Paul, Istanbul
- Saint Paul's Church, Tarsus
- Saint Paul Church, Adana

== Ukraine ==
- Saints Peter and Paul Church, Chernihiv
- Saints Peter and Paul Garrison Church, Lviv

== United Kingdom ==
- Old St Peter and St Paul's Church, Albury, Surrey
- Church of SS Peter & Paul, Aston, Birmingham
- Church of St Peter and St Paul, Barnby Dun, Barnby Dun, South Yorkshire
- Bath Abbey, also known as the Abbey Church of St Peter and St Paul, Somerset
- Church of St Peter & St Paul, Bleadon, Somerset
- St Peter and St Paul, Bristol
- St Peter and St Paul, Bromley, Kent (now London)
- St Peter and St Paul, Buckingham, Buckinghamshire
- St Peter and St Paul Church, Caistor, Lincolnshire
- Abbey of St. Peter and Paul, Canterbury, Kent
- Church of St Peter and St Paul, Chaldon, Surrey
- Church of St Peter & St Paul, Churchstanton, Somerset
- Church of St Peter and St Paul, Coleshill, Warwickshire
- Church of St Peter & St Paul, Combe Florey, Somerset
- Church of St Peter & St Paul, Cranfield, Bedfordshire
- St Peter and St Paul's Church, Eckington, Derbyshire
- St Peter and St Paul, Dagenham, Essex (now London)
- Church of St Peter and St Paul, Exton, Rutland
- Ss Peter and Paul Church, Eye, Suffolk
- Church of St Peter & St Paul, Flitwick, Bedfordshire
- Church of St Peter and St Paul, Great Missenden, Buckinghamshire
- St Peter & St Paul's Church, Gringley-on-the-Hill, Nottinghamshire
- Church of St Peter & St Paul, Godalming, Surrey
- St Peter & St Paul's Church, Harrington, Northamptonshire
- Church of St Peter and St Paul, Heytesbury, Wiltshire
- St Peter and St Paul Church, Honing, Norfolk
- St Peter and St Paul Church, Kimpton, Hertfordshire
- Church of St Peter & St Paul, Kingsbury, Warwickshire
- St Peter and St Paul's Church, Lavenham, Suffolk
- St Peter and St Paul's Church, Lingfield, Surrey
- Church of St Peter and St Paul, Long Compton, Warwickshire
- St Peter and St Paul's Church, Mansfield, Nottinghamshire
- The Abbey Church of Saint Peter and Saint Paul, or Monkwearmouth–Jarrow Abbey, County Durham
- St Peter and St Paul's Church, Mottistone, Isle of Wight
- Church of St Peter & St Paul, North Curry, Somerset
- Church of St Peter and St Paul, Ormskirk, Lancashire
- Church of St Peter and St Paul, Over Stowey, Somerset
- Church of Saints Peter and Paul, Olney, City of Milton Keynes, Buckinghamshire
- St Peter & St Paul's Church, Oxton, Nottinghamshire
- St Peter and St Paul's Church, Preston Deanery, Northamptonshire
- Church of St Peter and St Paul, Rock, Worcestershire
- Church of St Peter and St Paul, Shepton Mallet, Somerset
- Church of St Peter and St Paul, Stainton, Middlesbrough
- Sts. Peter and Paul Church, Stallingborough, Lincolnshire
- St Peter and St Paul's Church, Sturton-le-Steeple, Nottinghamshire
- Cathedral Church of St Peter and St Paul, Sheffield
- St Peter & St Paul's Church, Syston, Leicestershire
- Church of St Peter and St Paul, Tring, Hertfordshire
- Church of St Peter and St Paul, Trottiscliffe, Kent
- Church of St Peter and St Paul, Wantage, Oxfordshire
- St Peter & St Paul's Church, Watford, Northamptonshire
- St Peter and St Paul's Church, Weobley, Weobley, Herefordshire
- St. Peter & Paul Church, Wingrave, Buckinghamshire
- St Peter and St Paul's Church, Wisbech, Cambridgeshire
- St Peter and St Paul's Church, Wolverhampton, West Midlands

== United States ==
(by state)

- Sts. Peter and Paul Church (St. Paul Island, Alaska)
- Saints Peter and Paul Church, San Francisco, California
- Sts. Peter & Paul Catholic Church (Miami, Florida)
- Saints Peter and Paul Catholic Church (Honolulu), Hawaii
- Saints Peter and Paul Cathedral (Indianapolis)
- Saints Peter and Paul Roman Catholic Church (Harper, Iowa)
- Saints Peter and Paul Church (Petersburg, Iowa)
- Saints Peter and Paul Catholic Church (Pocahontas, Iowa)
- Saints Peter and Paul Catholic Church (Sherrill, Iowa), in Dubuque County, Iowa
- Saints Peter and Paul Catholic Church (Solon, Iowa)
- Basilica of Saints Peter and Paul (Lewiston, Maine)
- Saints Peter and Paul Jesuit Church, Detroit, Michigan
- Saints Peter and Paul Academy, Detroit, Michigan
- Sts. Peter and Paul Russian Orthodox Church, Bramble, Minnesota
- Saints Peter and Paul Church (Chisholm, Minnesota)
- Saints Peter and Paul Church (Gilman, Minnesota)
- Saints Peter and Paul Catholic Church Complex (Bow Valley, Nebraska)
- Ss. Peter and Paul Church, Williamsville, New York, NRHP-listed
- Saints Peter and Paul Church (New Hradec, North Dakota)
- Old Saints Peter and Paul Cemetery, Wrought-Iron Cross Site, Karlsruhe, North Dakota
- Saints Peter and Paul Catholic Church Complex (Strasburg, North Dakota)
- Saints Peter and Paul Catholic Church (Sandusky, Ohio), Sandusky, Ohio
- Saint Peter and Saint Paul Historic District, Toledo, Ohio, listed on the NRHP in Lucas County, Ohio
- Cathedral Basilica of Saints Peter and Paul (Philadelphia), Pennsylvania
- Saints Peter and Paul Church (Pittsburgh), Pennsylvania
- Cathedral of Saints Peter and Paul (Providence, Rhode Island)
- Basilica of Sts. Peter and Paul (Chattanooga), Tennessee
- Saints Peter and Paul Cathedral (St. Thomas, U.S. Virgin Islands)
- Saints Peter and Paul Roman Catholic Church Complex, Milwaukee, Wisconsin

== See also ==
- Saints Peter and Paul Catholic Church (disambiguation)
- Cathedral of Saints Peter and Paul (disambiguation)
- Basilica of Saints Peter and Paul (disambiguation)
- St. Peter's Church (disambiguation)
- St. Paul's Church (disambiguation)
