= Dehkadeh-ye Asayesh =

Dehkadeh-ye Asayesh دهكده اسايش
- Village
- Location within Iran
- Coordinates: 37°33′42″N 45°10′46″E
- Country: Iran
- Province: West Azerbaijan
- County: Urmia
- Bakhsh: Central
- Rural District: Bakeshluchay

Population (2006)
  - Total: 356
- Time zone: UTC+3:30 (IRST)
  - Summer (DST): UTC+4:30 (IRDT)

Dehkadeh-ye Asayesh (Persian: دهكده اسايش, also Romanized as Dehkadeh-ye Āsāyesh; also known as Āsāyesh) is a village in Bakeshluchay Rural District, in the Central District of Urmia County, West Azerbaijan Province, Iran. At the 2006 census, its population was 356, in 91 families.

== See also ==
- Sts. Peter and Paul Church
