= Saints Peter and Paul Church, Chernihiv =

Church in Chernihiv Oblast, Ukraine

Saints Peter and Paul Church
- Петропавлівська церква
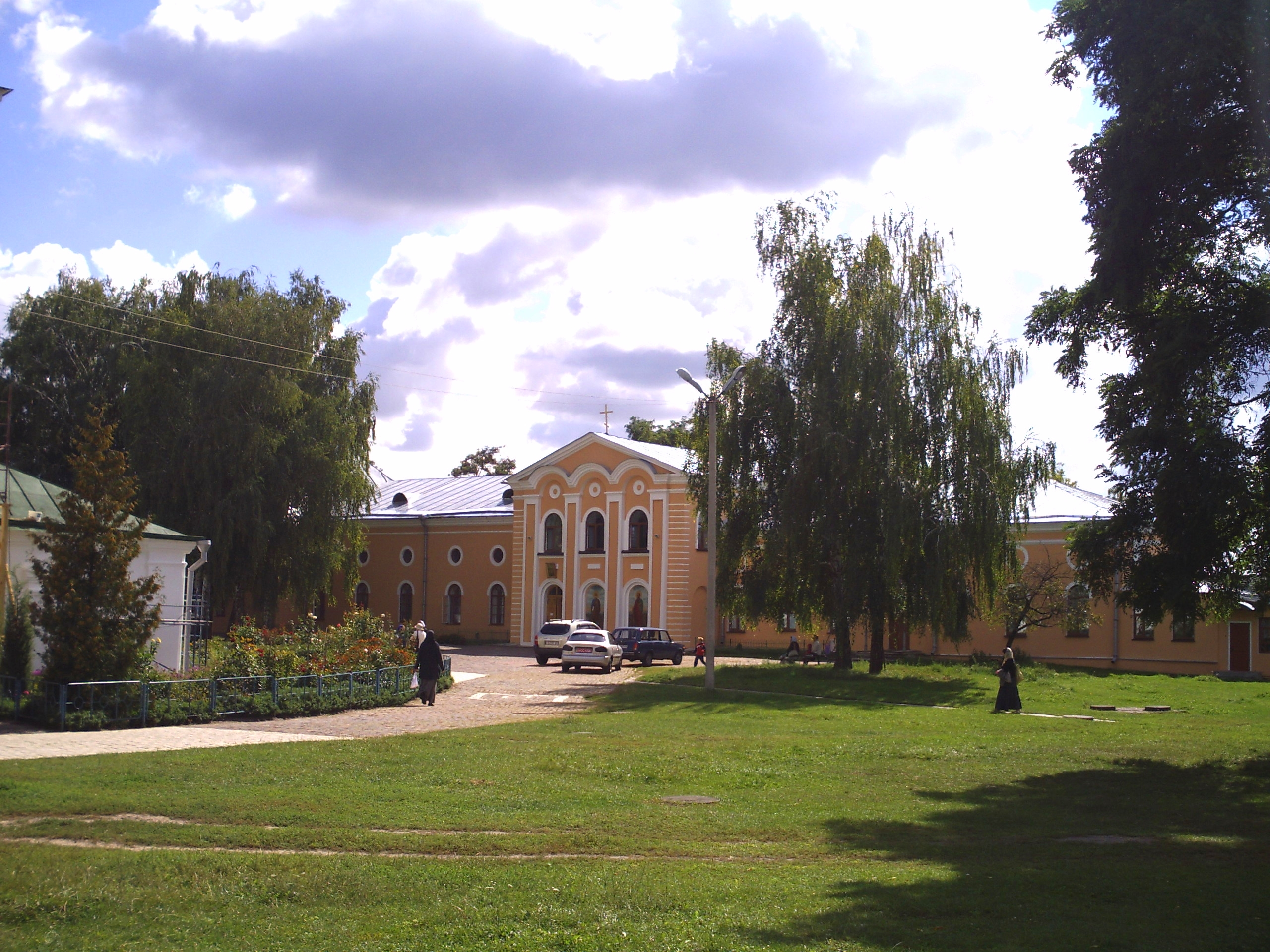
- Saints Peter and Paul Church in Chernihiv
- Saints Peter and Paul Church
- 51°29′05″N 31°17′43″E
- Location: Kotsiubynskoho Street 5, Chernihiv, Chernihiv Oblast, Ukraine, 14030
- Country: Ukraine
- Denomination: Eastern Orthodox Church

History
- Status: Chapel
- Founder: Ioaniky Galyatovsky

Architecture
- Functional status: Active; Museum
- Architectural type: Church
- Style: Ukrainian Baroque
- Years built: 7
- Groundbreaking: 1820

Administration
- Diocese: Chernihiv

The Saints Peter and Paul Church (Ukrainian: Петропавлівська церква, romanized: Petropavlivska tserkva) is the refectory church located in the Yeletskyi Monastery.

== Description ==
It is a part of the built complex of the Eletsky Assumption Monastery—a site of the historical and architectural reserve of Chernihiv Ancient, located on Eletskaya Gora. The walls are almost entirely covered with icons. During the communist regime it was used first as a theater, then as a sports club. Unlike the Assumption Cathedral, the Peter and Paul Church is a warm church, so divine services are held here mainly in winter. In the first half of the 19th century, the Peter and Paul Church was rebuilt south of the Assumption Cathedral.

== Gallery ==
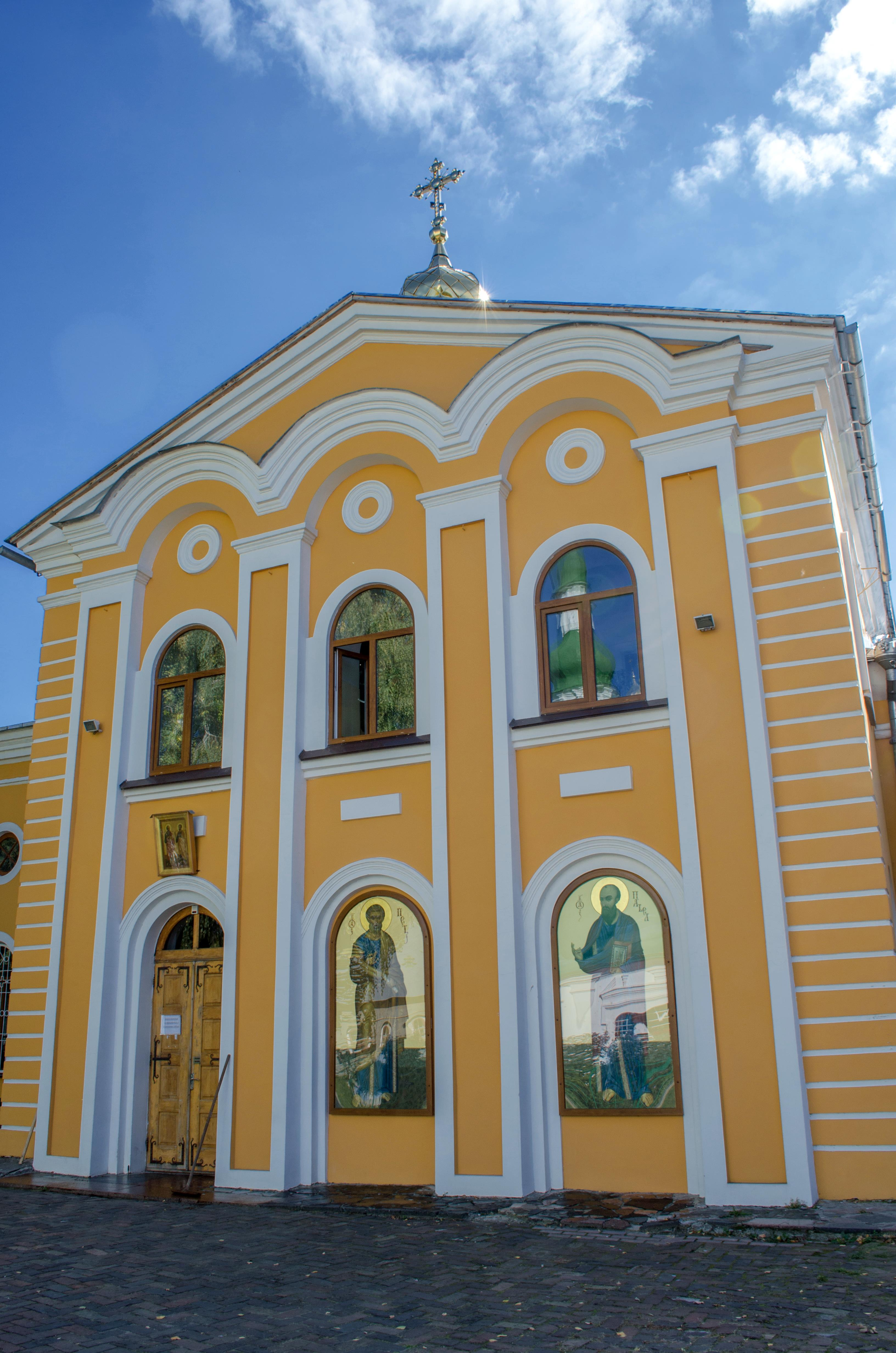

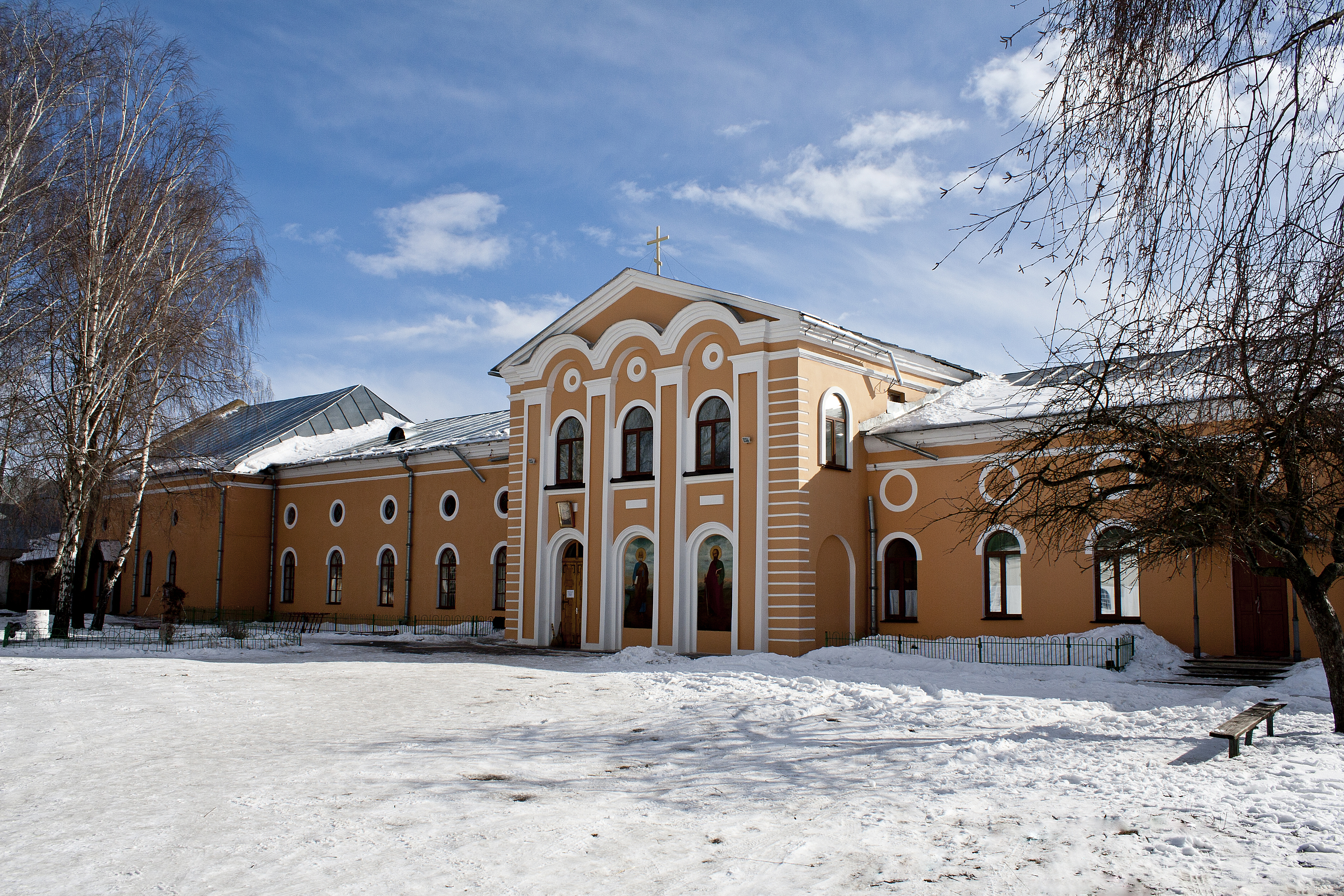

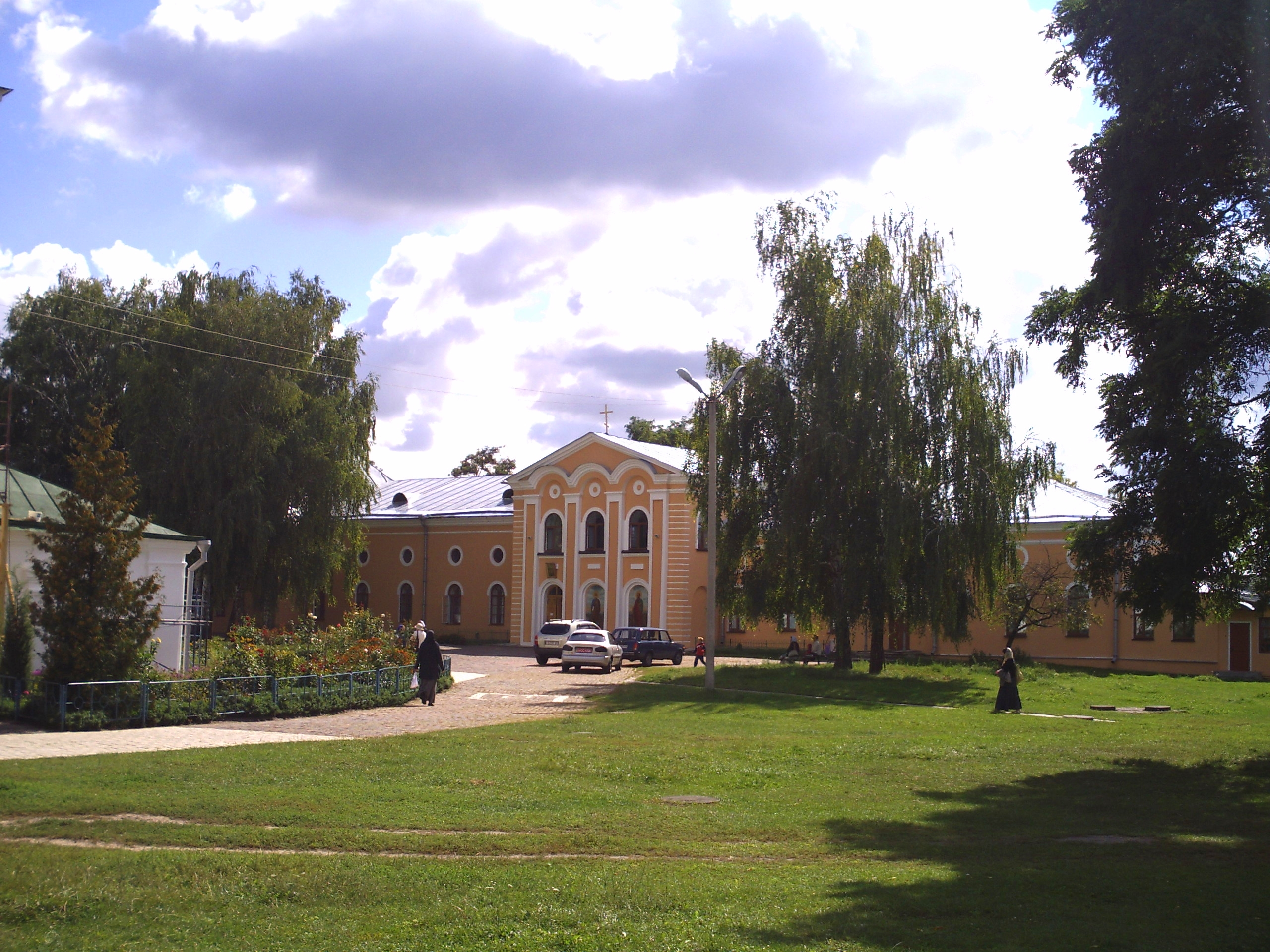

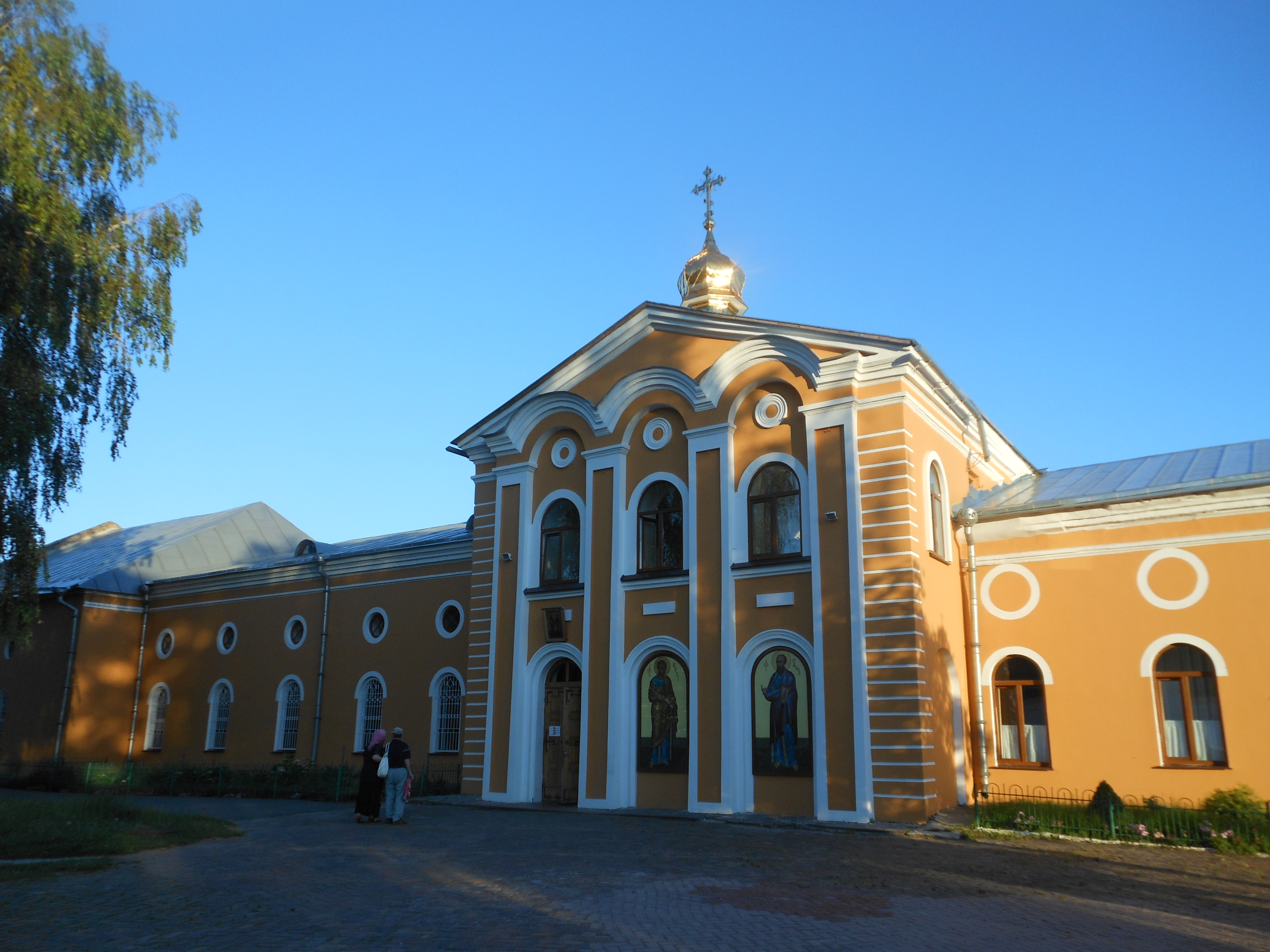

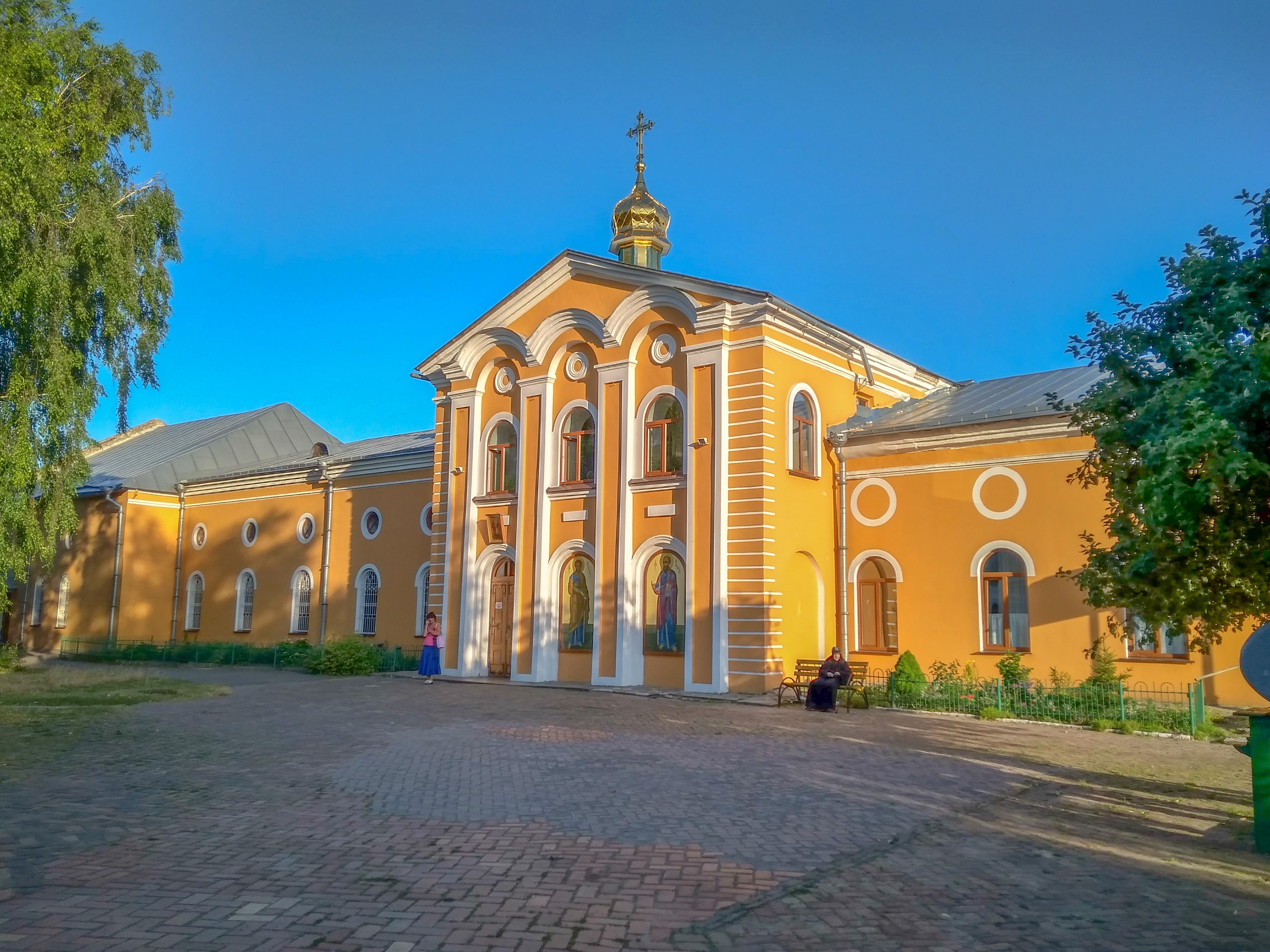

== See also ==
- List of Churches and Monasteries in Chernihiv
- St. Peter and St. Paul's Church
