= Basilica of Saints Peter and Paul =

Basilica of Saints Peter and Paul or Basilica of Sts. Peter and Paul or Basilica of St Peter and St Paul or Basilica of SS Peter and Paul, may refer to:

- Abbatial Basilica of SS Peter and Paul, Dendermonde Abbey, Dendermonde, Belgium
- Abbatial Basilica of SS Peter and Paul, Saint-Hubert, Belgium; see List of Catholic basilicas
- Basilica of St. Peter and St. Paul, Prague, Czech Republic
- Basilica of Saint Peter and Saint Paul; the former name of Notre-Dame de la Couture, Le Mans, Sarthe, Maine, Pays de la Loire, France
- Basilica of Sts. Peter and Paul, Dillingen, Swabia, Bavaria, Germany
- Basilica of Sts. Peter and Paul, Reichenau, Niederzell, Freiburg, Baden-Württemberg, Germany
- Sts. Peter and Paul's Cathedral Basilica; the formal name of Pécs Cathedral, Pécs, Baranya, Hungary
- Cathedral Basilica of Saints Peter and Paul, Kaunas, Lithuania
- Basilica of St Peter and St Paul, Nadur, Gozo, Malta
- Basilica of SS Peter and Paul, Boxmeer, Netherlands; see List of Catholic basilicas
- Archicathedral Basilica of St. Peter and St. Paul, Poznań, Greater Poland, Poland
- Saints Peter and Paul Basilica, Strzegom, Świdnica, Poland
- Basilica of St Peter and St Paul, Zawiercie, Poland; see List of Catholic basilicas
- Basilica of St Peter and St Paul, Leśna Podlaska, Poland; see List of Catholic basilicas
- Basilica of St Peter and St Paul, Kruszwica, Poland; see List of Catholic basilicas
- Cathedral-Basilica of Saint Peter and Paul; the formal name of Saint Peter and Paul Cathedral, Paramaribo, Suriname
- Basilica of Saints Peter and Paul (Lewiston, Maine), USA
- Cathedral Basilica of Saints Peter and Paul (Philadelphia), Pennsylvania, USA
- Basilica of Sts. Peter and Paul (Chattanooga), Hamilton, Tennessee, USA

== See also ==
- All pages with titles containing "Basilica" and "Peter" and "Paul"
- Basilica of Saint Peter
- Basilica of Saint Paul
- Cathedral of Saints Peter and Paul (disambiguation)
- St. Peter and St. Paul's Church (disambiguation)
