= Saints Peter and Paul Church (Chisholm, Minnesota) =

Historic church in Minnesota, United States

- Saints Peter and Paul Church–Ukrainian Catholic
- U.S. National Register of Historic Places
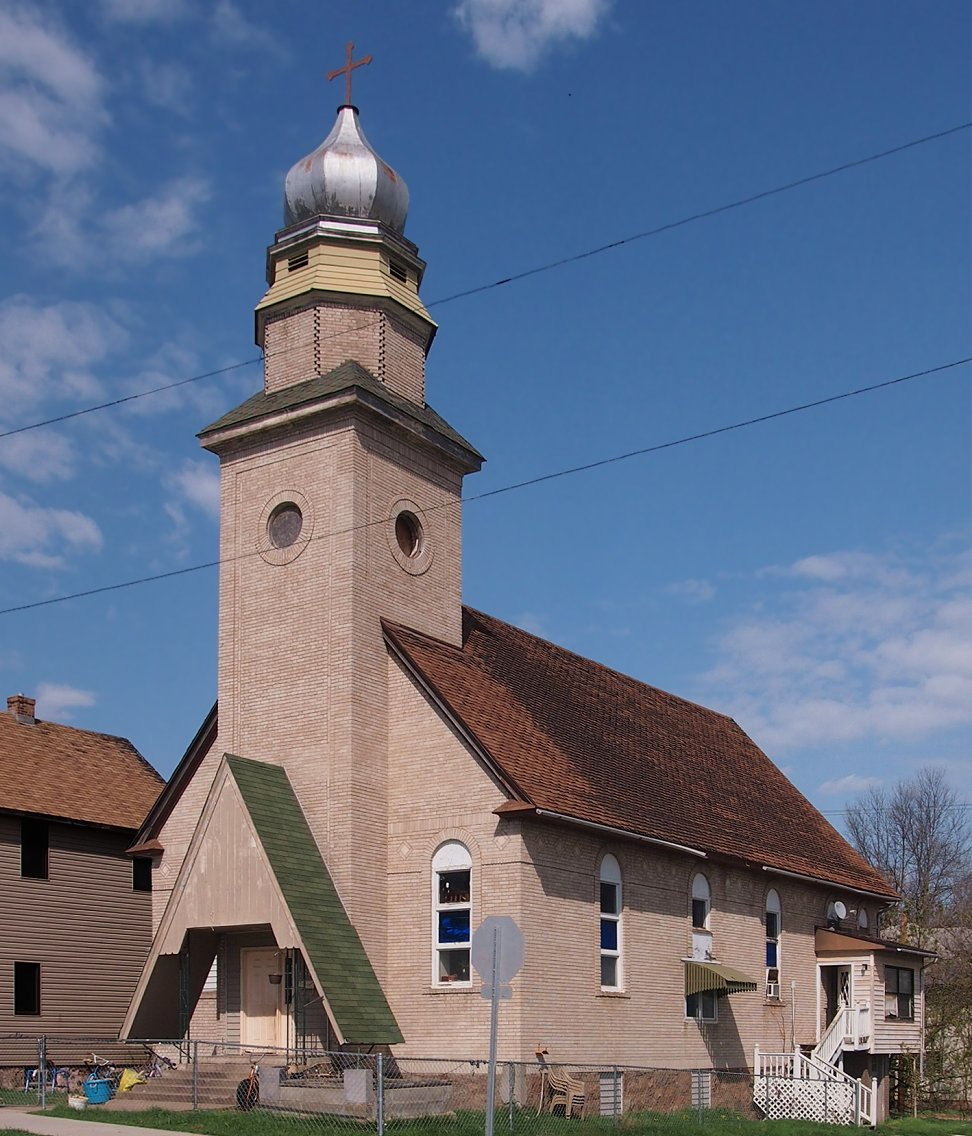
- Saints Peter and Paul Church from the southwest

- Location within Minnesota Location within the United States
- Location: 530 Central Avenue, Chisholm, Minnesota
- Coordinates: 47°29′0.7″N 92°52′43.5″W
- Area: Less than one acre
- Built: 1916
- NRHP reference No.: 80004340
- Added to NRHP: August 27, 1980

The Saints Peter and Paul Church in Chisholm, Minnesota is a former Ukrainian Catholic church building. It was built in 1916 by a congregation of Ukrainian immigrants. The church was listed on the National Register of Historic Places as Saints Peter and Paul Church–Ukrainian Catholic in 1980 for its local significance in the themes of religion and social history. It was nominated for its role in anchoring its community of Ukrainian Americans, the final ethnic group to arrive on the Iron Range during its turn-of-the-20th-century immigration influx.

== See also ==
- List of Catholic churches in the United States
- National Register of Historic Places listings in St. Louis County, Minnesota
