= Sts. Peter and Paul Church, Urmia =

Ancient Assyrian church near Urmia, Iran

- Location within Iran

Religion
- Affiliation: Assyrian Church of the East

Location
- Location: Asayesh, Urmia, West Azarbaijan Province, Iran
- Interactive map of Sts. Peter and Paul Church, Urmia
- Coordinates: 37.558990°N 45.179050°E

Architecture
- Type: Church
- Groundbreaking: 8th century

Sts. Peter and Paul Church (Imperial Aramaic: ܩܕܝܫܬܐ ܡܪܝ ܦܵܛܪܘܿܣ ܦܵܘܠܘܿܣ, Persian: کلیسای مار پطروس و پولس) is an ancient Assyrian church located in Asayesh, Bakeshluchay east of Urmia, West Azerbaijan Province, Iran. This church is built in the 8th century by Bukhtishu II, physician in the court of Caliph Harun al-Rashid. It is a pilgrim place of local Assyrian Christians and has recently been restored by Iranian Ministry of Cultural Heritage.

== See also ==
- Iranian Assyrians
