= Saints Peter and Paul Church, Pitești =

Roman Catholic church in Argeș County, Romania

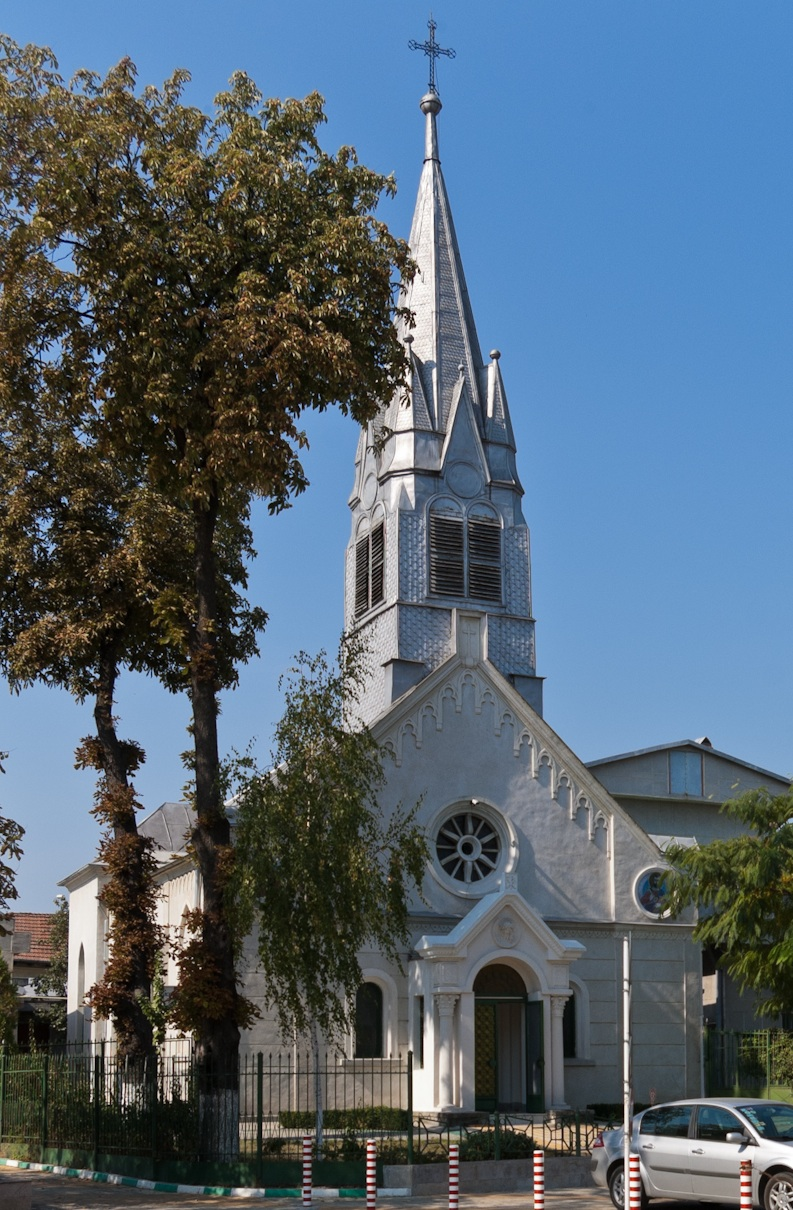
Saints Peter and Paul Church

Saints Peter and Paul Church (Romanian: Biserica Sfinții Petru și Pavel) is a Roman Catholic church in Pitești, Romania, located at 11 Victoriei Street.

Initially, the parish functioned in a chapel dedicated in 1864, serving a local Catholic community drawn from various nationalities: Germans or Transylvanian Saxons, Austrians, Czechs, Poles, Italians and Hungarians. The current building was constructed in 1895–1896, and expanded in 1996. A new parish house was built between 1990 and 1996. The church has a choir and participates in cultural and charity activities. The parish has its feast day on June 29, and it is part of the Bucharest Archdiocese. The building is considered a historic monument by Romania's Culture Ministry.
