= Church of the Holy Apostles Peter and Paul, Shadrinka =

Orthodox church in Sverdlovsk Oblast, Russia

Church of the Holy Apostles Peter and Paul
- Церковь Петра и Павла
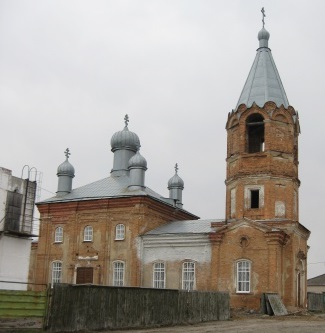
- Interactive map of the Church of the Holy Apostles Peter and Paul area

General information
- Location: Shadrinka
- Coordinates: 57°33′54″N 63°28′02″E
- Completed: the end of the 19th century

Church of the Holy Apostles Peter and Paul is an Orthodox church in Shadrinka village, Sverdlovsk Oblast.

The building was granted the status of regional significance on 18 February 1991 (decision № 75 by the executive committee of Sverdlovsk Oblast Council of People's Deputies). The object number of cultural heritage of regional significance is 661410159470005.

== History ==
The church is located in the northern part of the village, on the left bank of the Shavushka River.

It is made of stone. There is one altar in the church. The building construction began in 1863. The church was consecrated in the name of the Holy Apostles Peter and Paul on 4 November 1868. The parish consists of six villages. There were two stone chapels in two villages. The number of parishioners was little more than 2000. The parishional school worked in Shadrinka village.

The church was closed in 1930. The building was returned to the ROC in 1992. It is being renovated nowadays. The church functions.

== Architecture ==
The building consists of three parts: a temple with a pentagonal apse, a refectory and a bell tower, on the sides of the base - porches. The main part of the building has the form of cube. The four-sloped roof is decorated with five domes. The walls are ornamented with pilasters and deepening vertical stripes. The small upper window openings are shallow arched. The lower ones – with subtle arch outlines. Under the first row of window openings are horizontal deepenings.

The belfry is two-tiered, crowned with a tent with eight-slope roof. The second tier is decorated with a "weave" of keeled arches and small corbel-arches.

== Literature ==
- Свод памятников истории и культуры Свердловской области. Vol. 2. Екатеринбург: Сократ. 2008. p. 648. ISBN 978-5-88664-323-7 – via ред. В.Е.Звагельская.
- Бурлакова Н.Н. (2011). Забытые храмы Свердловской области. Екатеринбург: Сократ. pp. 128–129. ISBN 978-5-88664-395-4.
