= Basilica of Sts. Peter and Paul, Reichenau =

Coordinates: 47°42′25″N 9°02′39″E

Basilica of Sts. Peter and Paul
- Basilika St. Peter und Paul
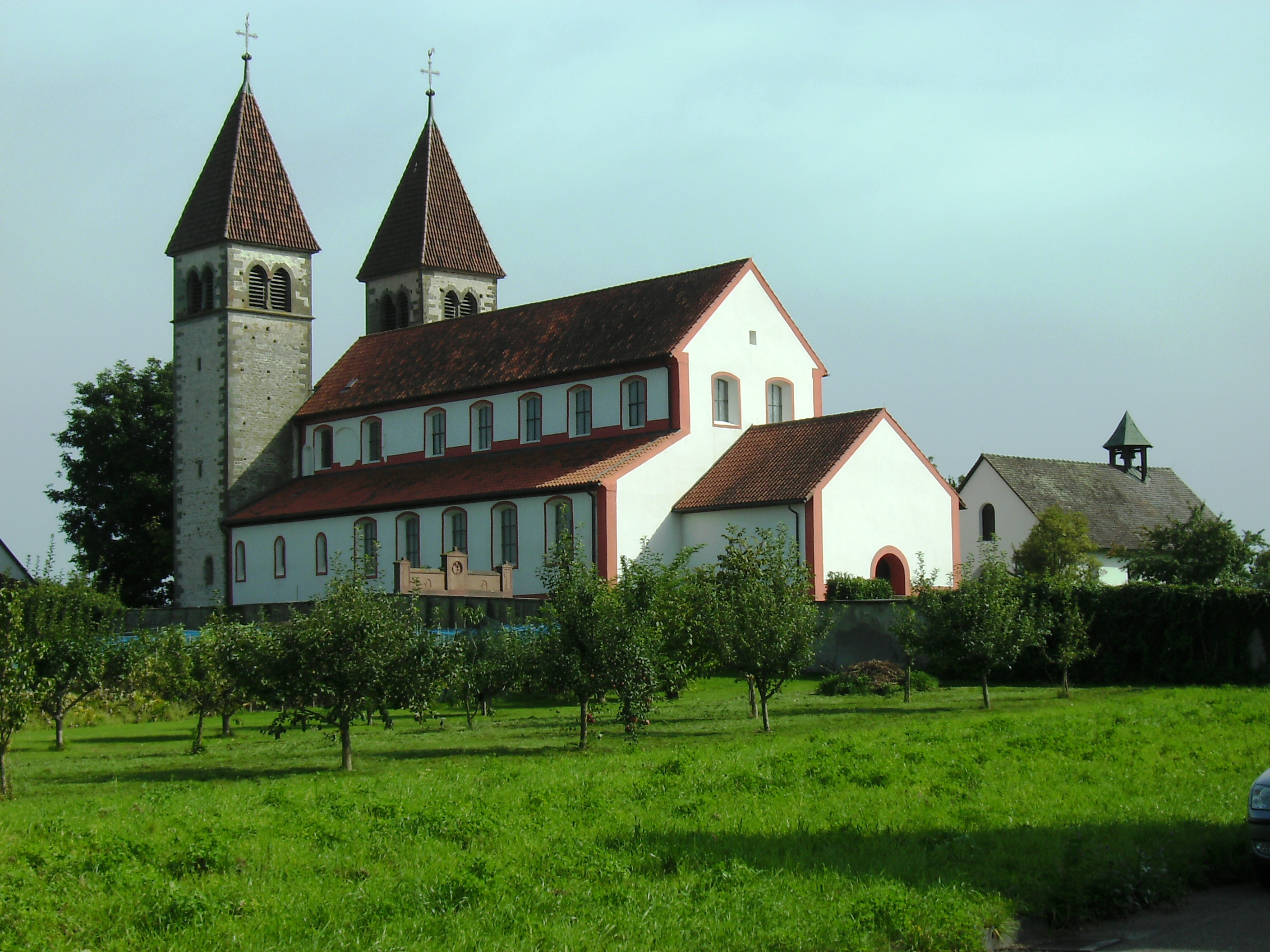

- Location within Baden-Württemberg
- Location: Reichenau
- Country: Germany
- Denomination: Catholic Church

The Basilica of Sts. Peter and Paul (German: Basilika St. Peter und Paul ) also called Reichenau Basilica It is a Catholic church of Romanesque style located in the island of Reichenau in Niederzell in the municipality of Reichenau to the south of Germany.

The first church dedicated to St. Peter in this place was built in 799 by the Egino bishop of Verona, who had retired to a monastery here in the territory of the abbey of Reichenau, after having ruled the diocese of Verona, where he died in the year 802.

The church consists of a room of worship with a single apse, which had to be very richly adorned, as evidenced by the ornamental reliefs that remained in the present northern aisle of the temples. The remains (not visible) of the mural paintings of the Carolingian period show that the walls of the church originally had a great artistic wealth. However, after two fires the backbone of the temple collapsed around 1080 and in the ancient foundations, maintaining the original measurements, a basilica was built without a transept. The last work on the cover of the new church goes back to 1134. An important restructuring of the interior space took place in the years 1750/60.

== See also ==
- Roman Catholicism in Germany
- Basilica of Saints Peter and Paul (disambiguation)

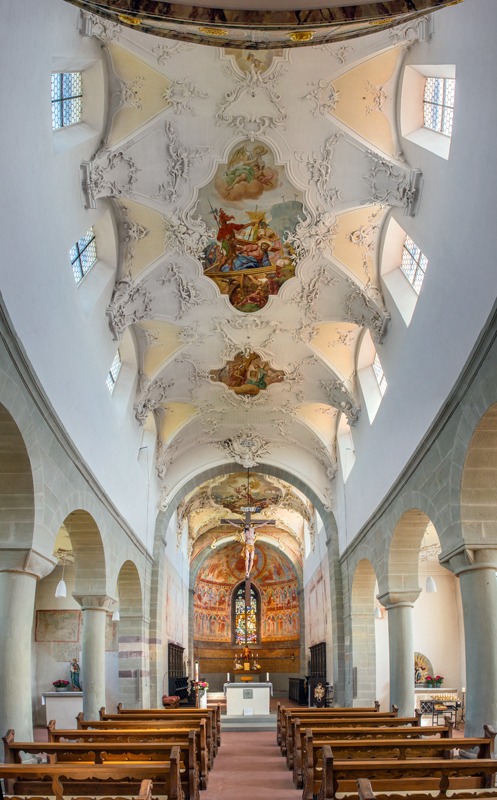
Internal view
