= Church of the Holy Apostles Peter and Paul, Neivo-Shaitansky =

Orthodox church in Sverdlovsk Oblast, Russia

Church of the Holy Apostles Peter and Paul
- Церковь Петра и Павла
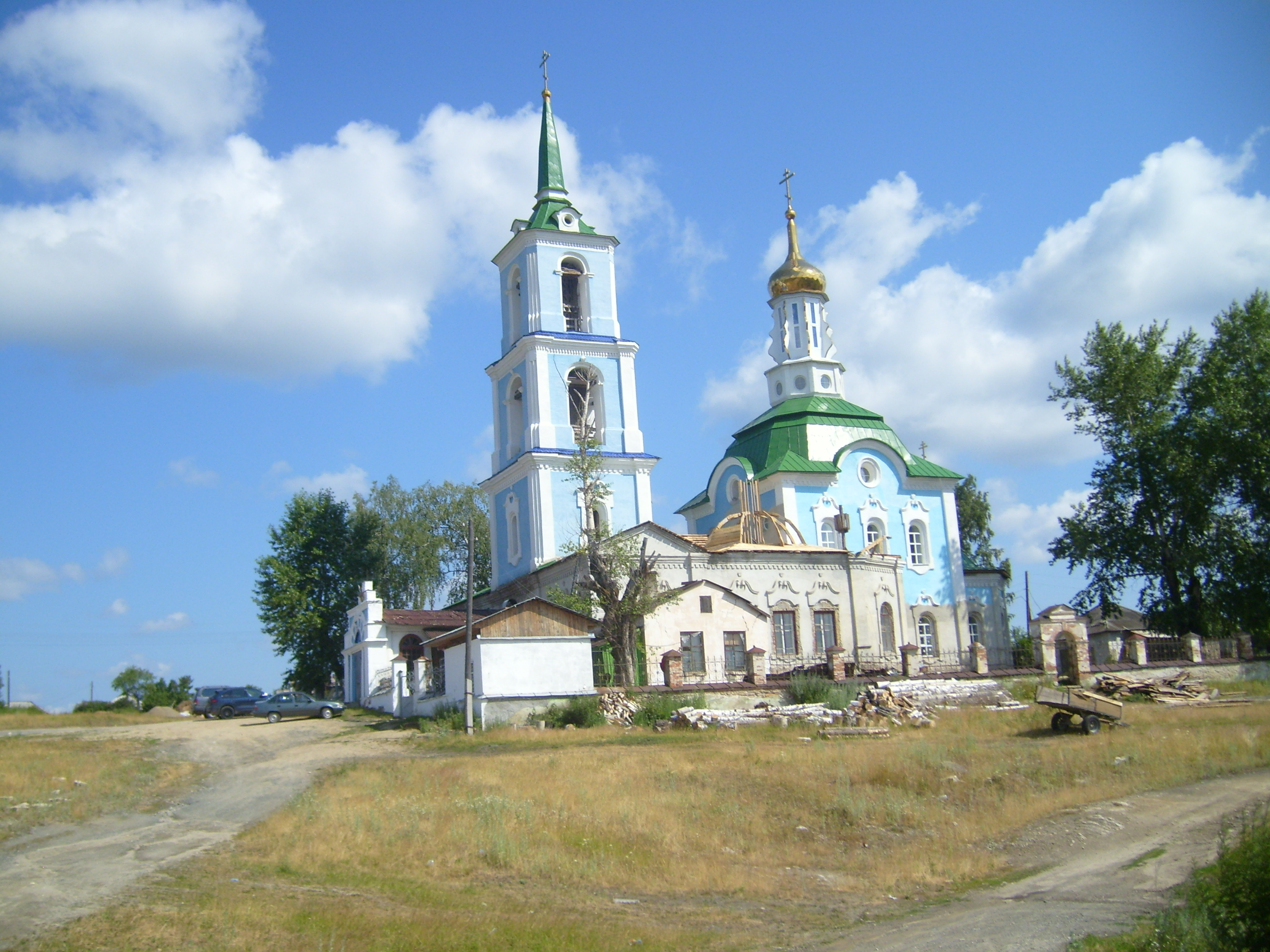
- Interactive map of the Church of the Holy Apostles Peter and Paul area

General information
- Location: Neivo-Shaitansky
- Coordinates: 57°44′15″N 61°15′15″E
- Completed: the 18th century

The Church of the Holy Apostles Peter and Paul is an Orthodox church in Neivo-Shaitansky settlement, Sverdlovsk oblast.

The building was granted the status of regional significance on 31 December 1987 (decision No. 535 by the executive committee of Sverdlovsk oblast Council of People's Deputies). The object number of cultural heritage of regional significance is 661710842370005.

== History ==
The church is located in the northern part of the village on the left bank of the Susanka River. The first wooden building of the church had been building since 1750 to 1754. The church was consecrated in the name of the Holy Apostles Peter and Paul. The construction of a large stone building began in 1797. The temple was built on the means of the Yakovlevs plants’ owners. The work was ended on 27 May 1812. The side-altar of the two-altar church was consecrated in the name of the Entry of the Most Holy Theotokos into the Temple.

The third side-altar had been building since 1871 to 1878. It was consecrated in the name of the St. Alexander Nevsky. In 1880-1881 the church was painted and decorated. In the main part of the church a five-tiered iconostasis was installed. There were a lot of rare and hold sacred icons: "Pochaev's Mother of God which painted with oil paints on a wooden board in the Turinsk women's monastery and the icon of the Athonite Mother of God, painted in the Athos St. Andrew's skete on a cypress board." The clergy of a parish owned several houses in the village.

The church was closed in 1936. It had been functioning since 1947 to 1962. Than the kindergarten was located in the building. In 1990 the collegium was rebuilt and restoration work was started.

== Architecture ==
The composition of the main stone building includes a temple volume of a quartet with a pentahedral apse, a refectory, a bell tower, a refectory, a forward-looking porch, which is wider at the expense of the chapels. The corners of the quarter are treated with blades, and at the end of the walls - smoothly curved ledges with windows.

== Literature ==
- Свод памятников истории и культуры Свердловской области. Vol. 2. Екатеринбург: Сократ. 2008. p. 648. ISBN 978-5-88664-323-7 – via ред. В.Е.Звагельская.
- Бурлакова Н.Н. (2011). Забытые храмы Свердловской области. Екатеринбург: Сократ. pp. 128–129. ISBN 978-5-88664-395-4.
- Приходы и церкви Екатеринбургской епархии. Екатеринбург: Братство Св. Праведного Симеона Верхотурского Чудотворца. 1902. p. 647.
