= Church of St. Peter and St. Paul, Plateliai =

Church of St. Peter and St. Paul the Apostles
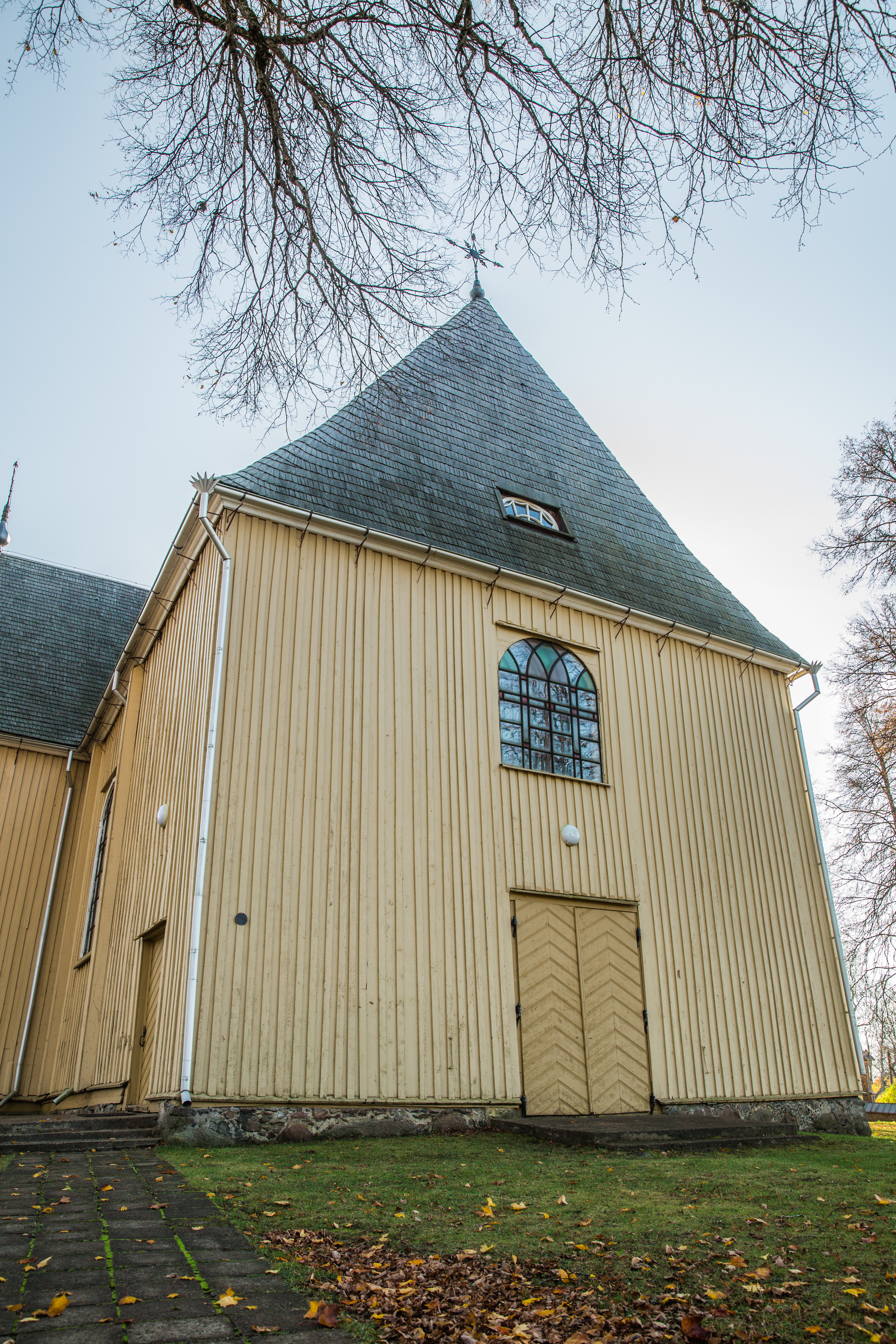
- Interactive map of the Church of St. Peter and St. Paul the Apostles area

General information
- Location: Plateliai, Lithuania
- Coordinates: 56.040586°N 21.816180°E

Website
- www.

Church of St. Peter and St. Paul the Apostles is a Roman Catholic church located in Plateliai, Plungė District Municipality, Lithuania. It is part of the nationally significant sacral heritage. The complex consists of the church built in 1744 and the bell tower built in 1899.

== History ==
The St Peter and St Paul the Apostles church is one of the oldest in Lithuania. It was built from debarked logs, and many paintings, items of liturgical clothing and objects from the 18th century still remain within the church. Later, the church was renovated and repaired more than once; however, its appearance has changed little.

The first church in Plateliai was built by a nobleman of the Grand Duchy of Lithuania, Stanislovas Kęsgaila. The church was built on a former pagan worship site that existed prior to the Christianisation of Samogitia.

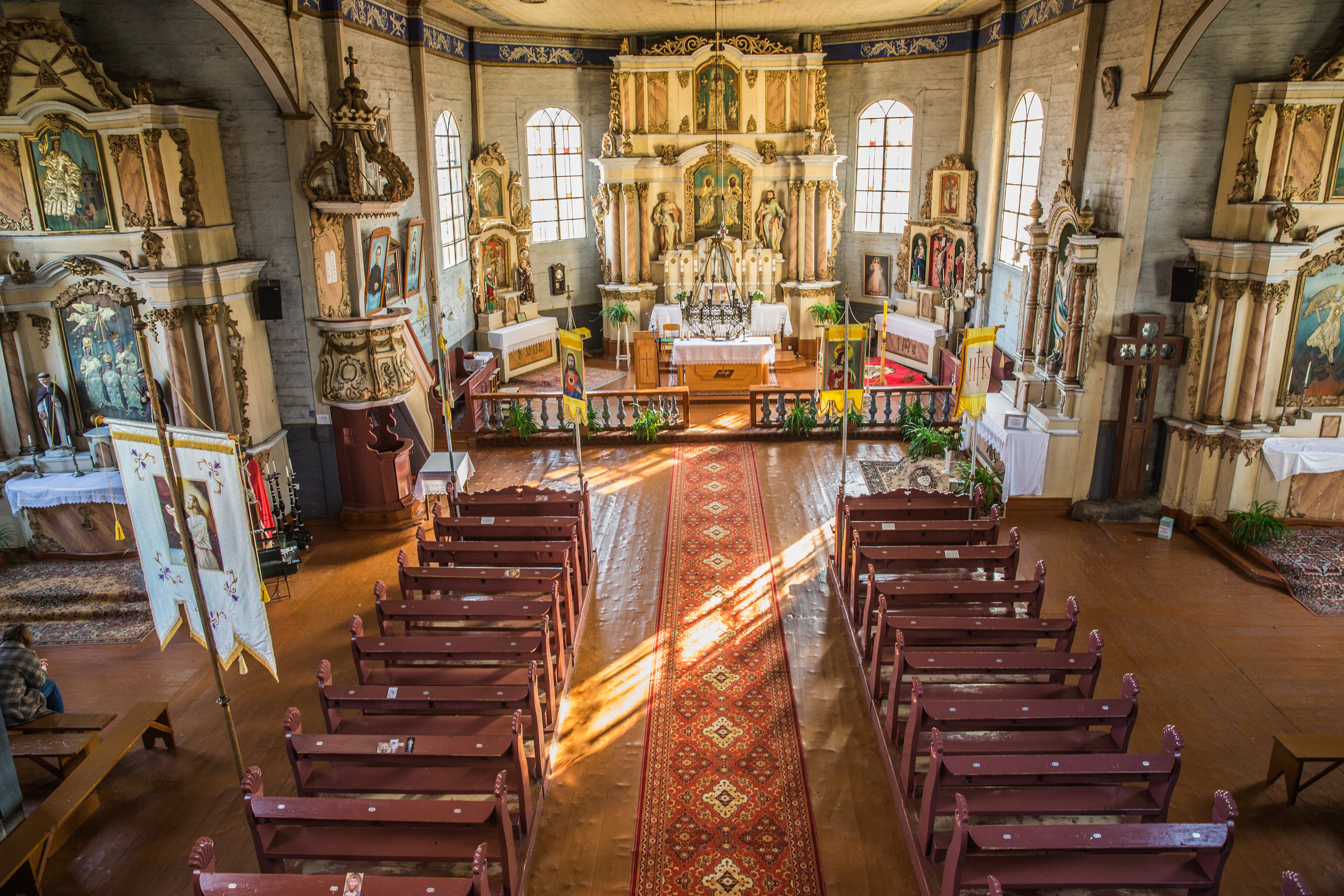
The interior of the church

At the beginning of the 18th century, Plateliai Town was greatly damaged by war and fire. In the middle of the century, Juozapas Vaitkevičius was assigned there as the parish priest. He organised the building of the Plateliai and Beržoras churches.

== Interior ==
The interior of the St Peter and St Paul the Apostles church is decorated by a great altar and four side altars of a Baroque composition. They are enhanced by columns, wooden carvings and paintings with silver cladding. In the chapel on the left-hand side, there is a Rococo style baptismal font with a cover, where holy water and the Oil of Salvation are kept. Above it there is a large painting of St John the Baptist. The baptismal bowl has remained in the church since the time when the church was built. In the crypt the last owners of Plateliai Mansion, Marie Choiseul-Gouffier and her brother Gabriel Choiseul-Gouffier, are buried.

== Gallery ==
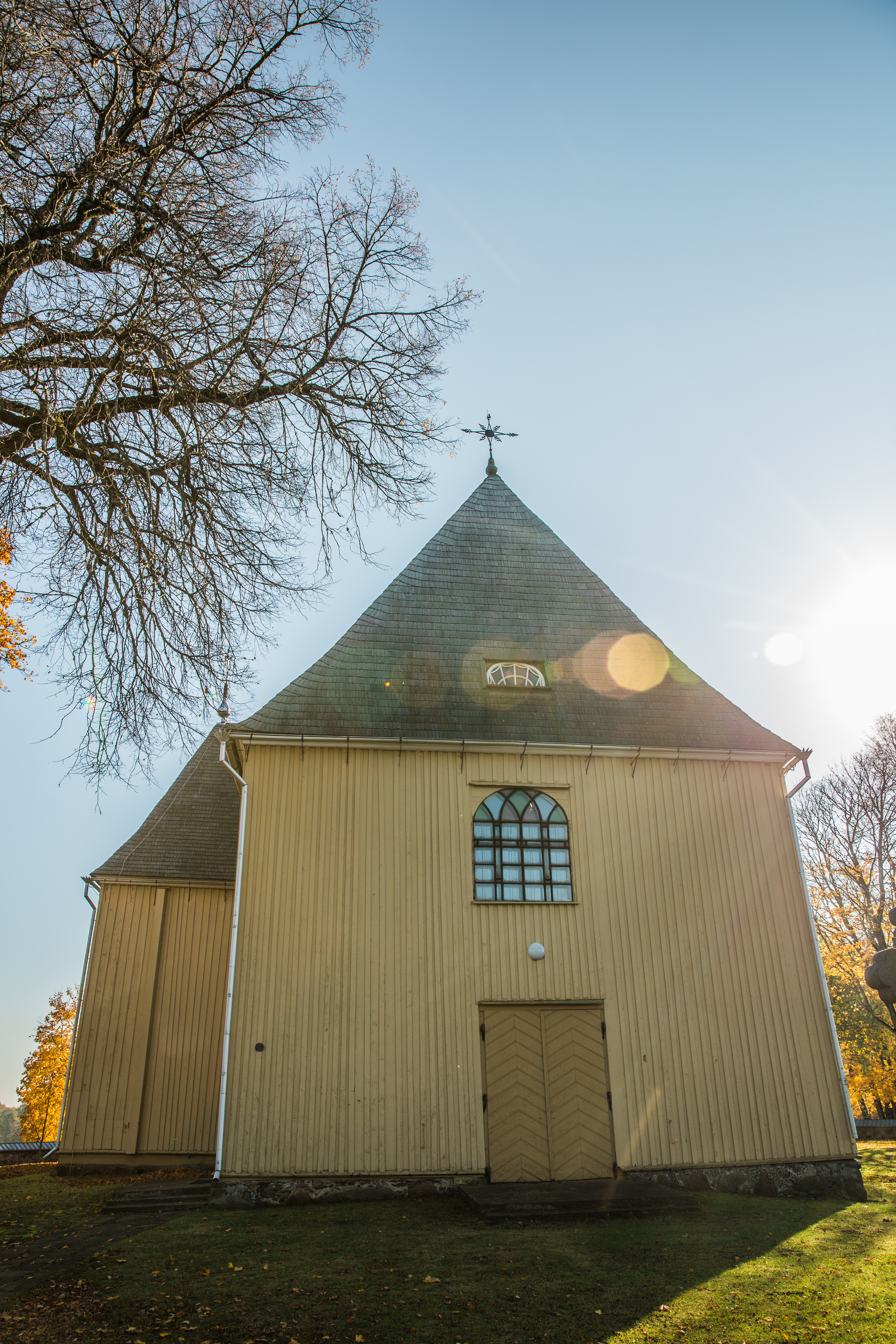

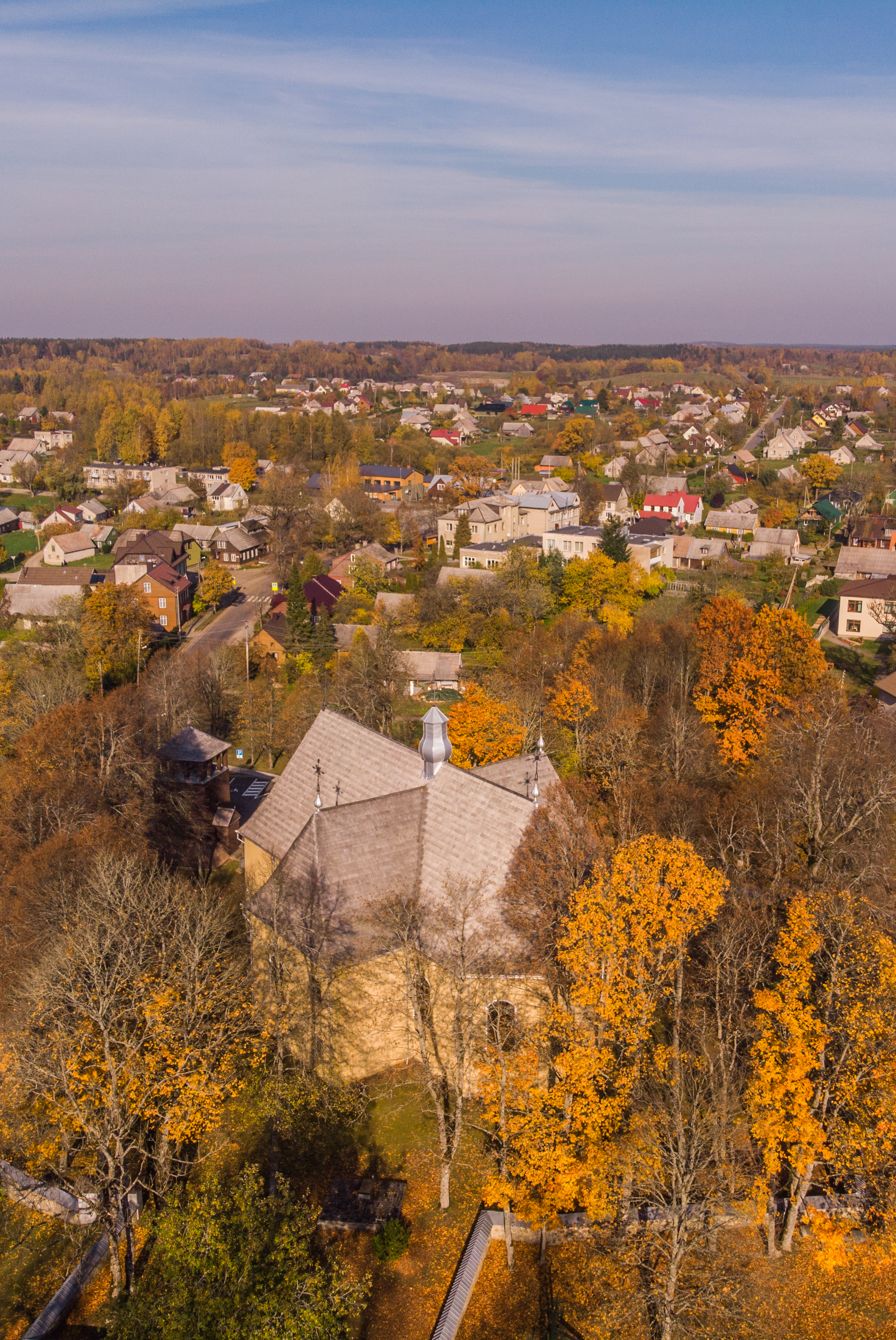

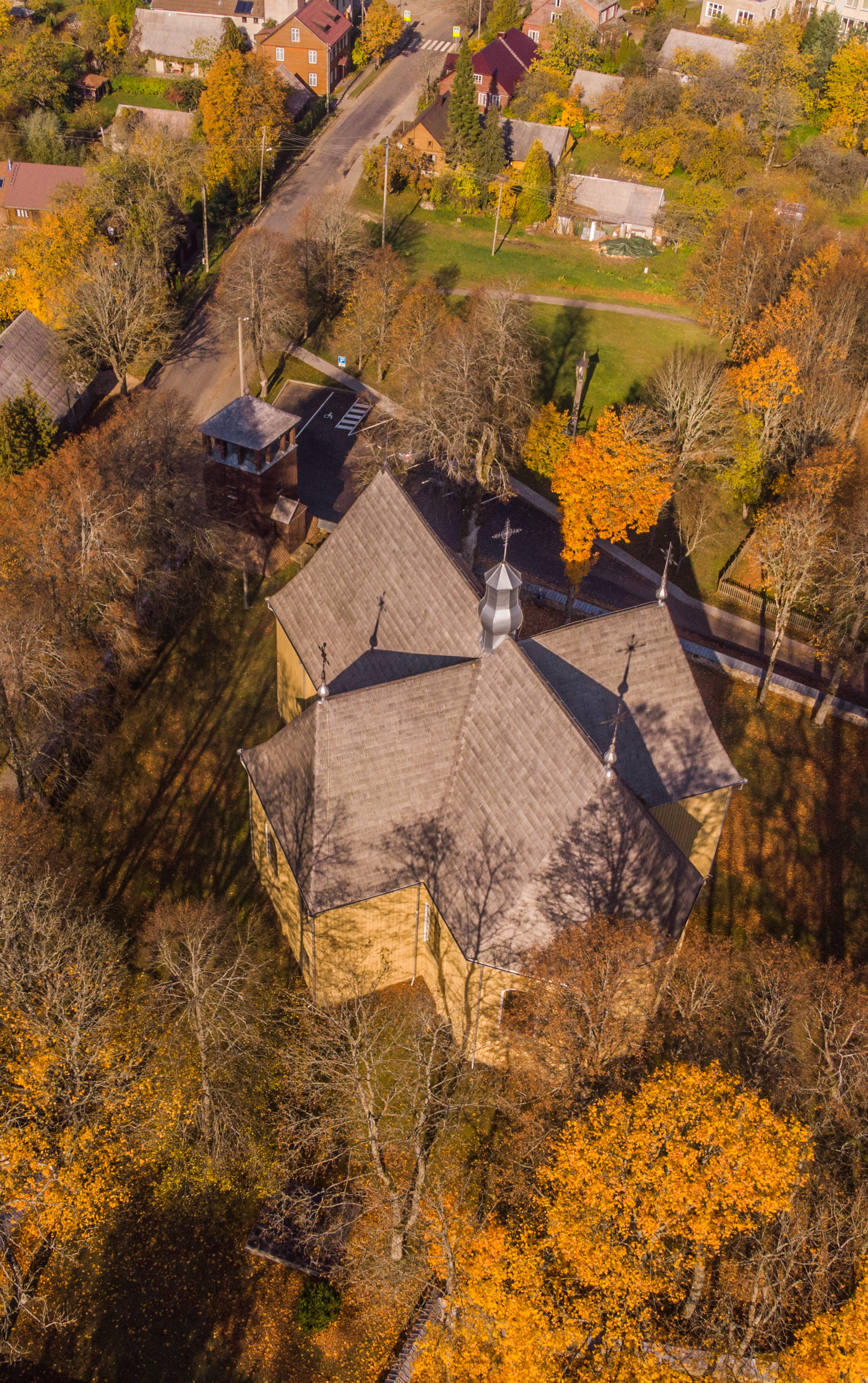

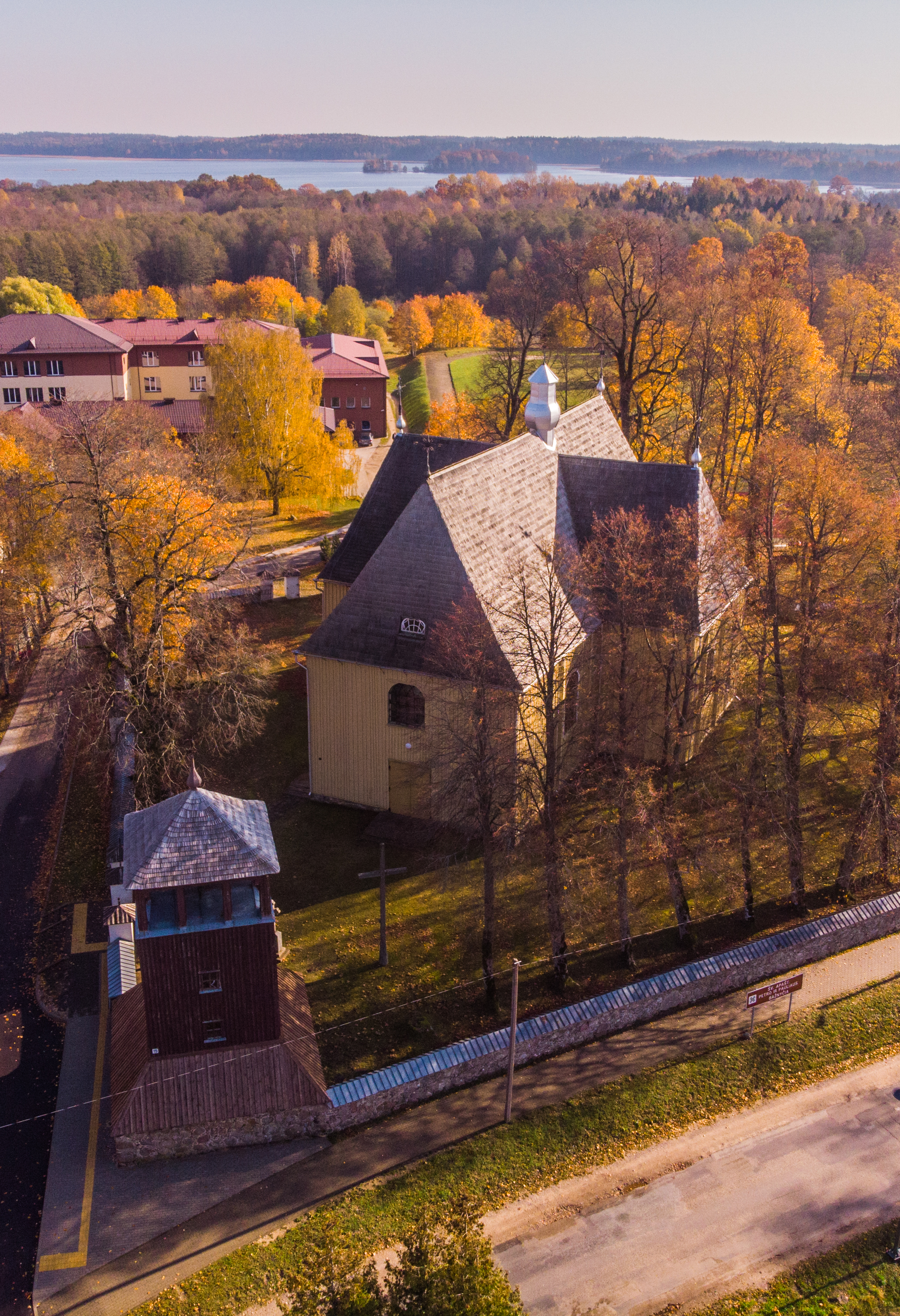

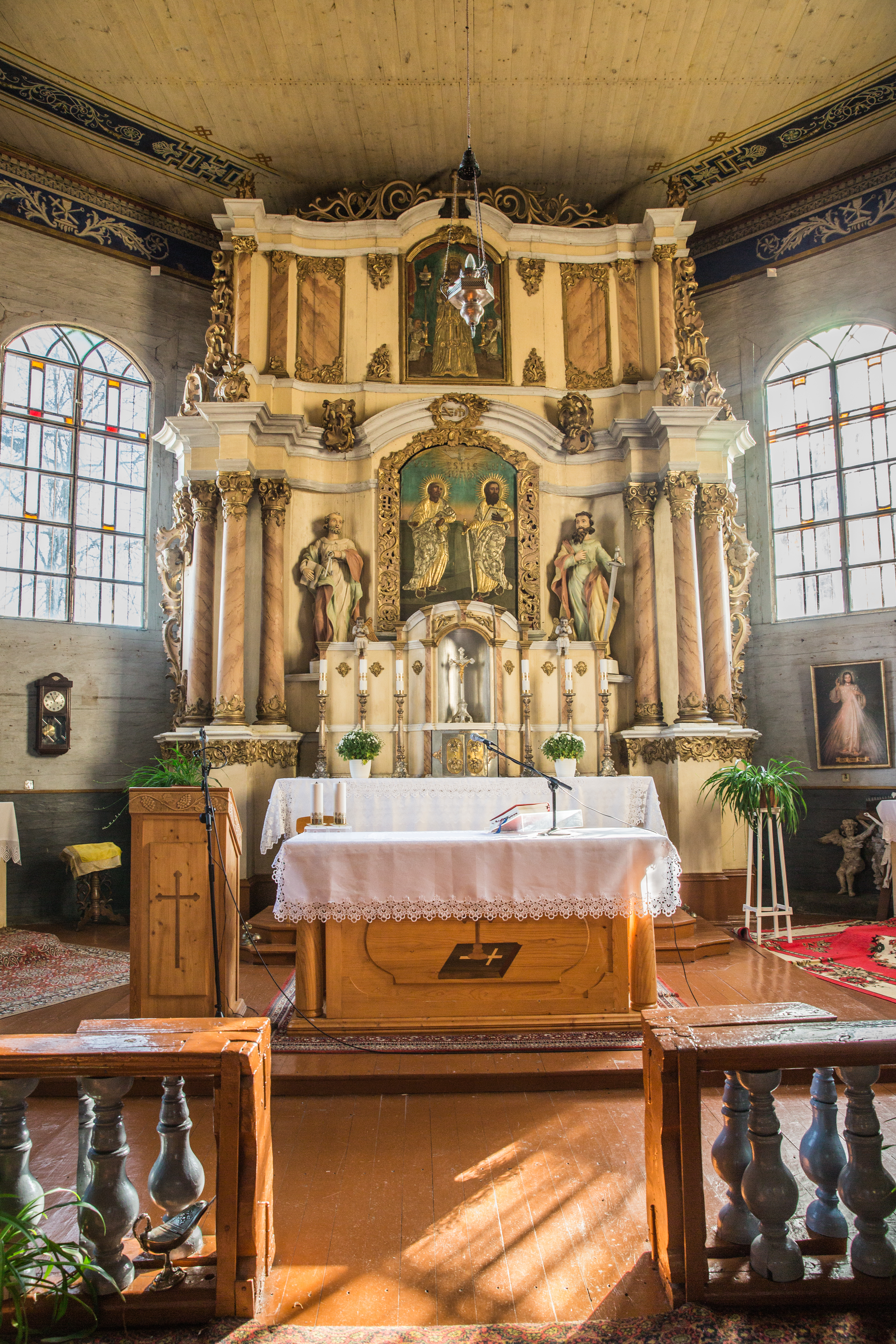
