= Church of St. Peter and Paul, Mostar =

Church of St. Peter and Paul
- Franjevačka crkva i samostan sv. Petra i Pavla
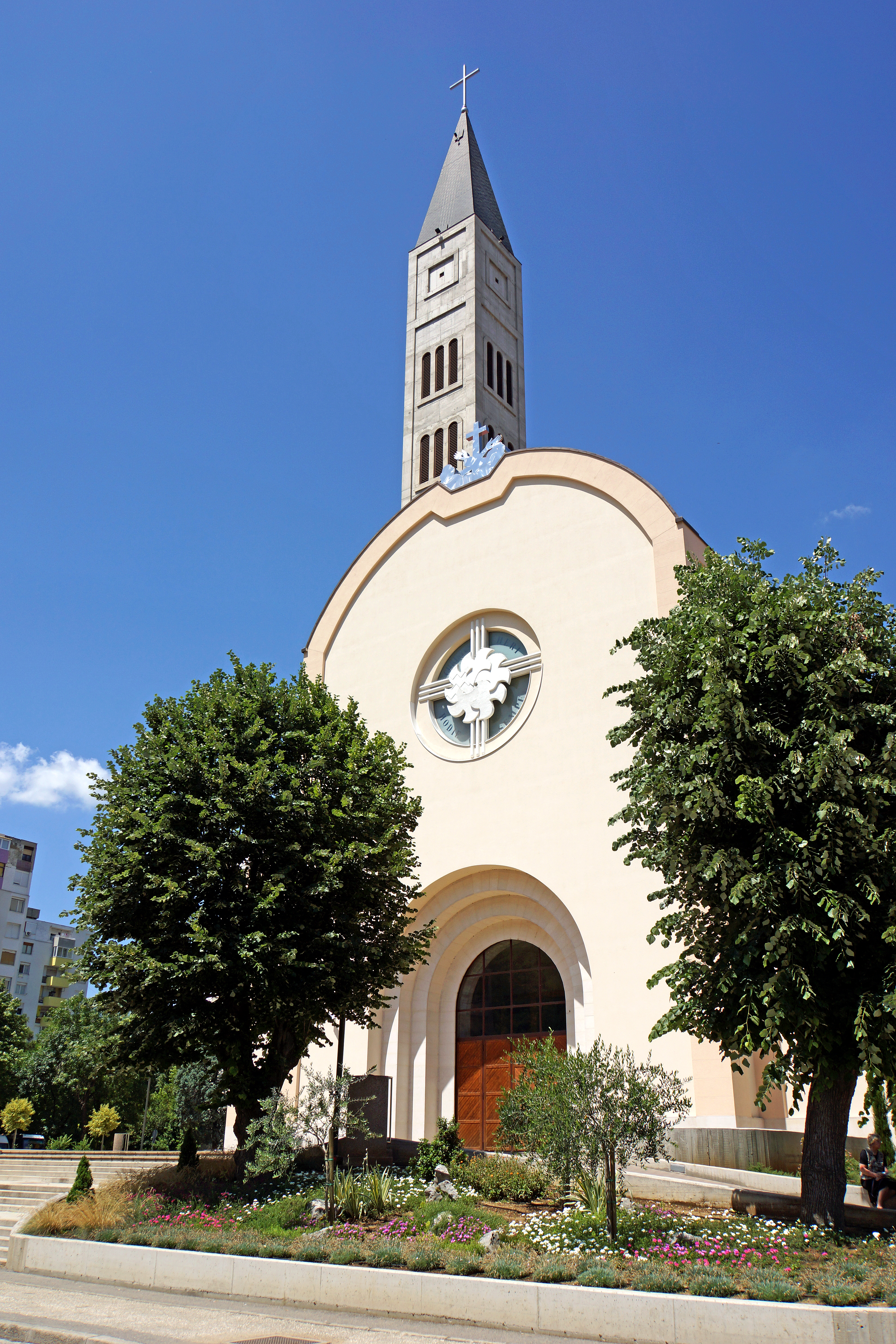
- The church in 2013

- Location in Bosnia and Herzegovina
- 43°20′16″N 17°48′31″E
- Location: Mostar
- Country: Bosnia and Herzegovina
- Denomination: Roman Catholic
- Website: franjevci.info

History
- Status: Active
- Founded: 1866
- Dedication: St. Peter and St. Paul

Architecture
- Functional status: Roman Catholic church and monastery
- Architect(s): Matteo Lorenzoni (church); Miloš Komadina (monastery)
- Architectural type: Church
- Style: Modernism
- Years built: 1866 (old church), 1999 (new church)
- Demolished: 1992 (old church)

The Church of St. Peter and Paul is a Roman Catholic church with a monastery in Mostar. It is located along the river Radobolja, at the foot of Hum Hill. The church is run by the Franciscans.

== History ==
The last catholic church in Mostar, the church of St. Anthony of Padua, was torn down in 1563 and the Franciscans were expelled from Herzegovina. However, in 1862, at the request of the apostolic vicar of Herzegovina Rafael Barišić and at the behest of Omar Pasha, the Ottoman sultan Abdulaziz gave away Ali-pasha Rizvanbegović's garden in Zahum for the construction of a church. The cornerstone of the church was laid on March 7, 1866 and construction lasted for six years. Italian friar Matteo Lorenzoni was the architect. In 1890, conscrution of the monastery began and it was officially opened on December 6, 1894. The architect of the monastery was Miloš Komadina. In 1917, the stone floor in the church was replaced with ceramic, and in 1927, bells were placed in the bell tower. During World War II, the church and monastery were bombed several times by the Allies, causing severe damage.

During the Siege of Mostar, on the night of May 9-10, 1992, the Yugoslav People's Army shelled and burned down the church. It was rebuilt after the war. The church has the tallest bell tower in Bosnia and Herzegovina (107 meters). It is also the tallest bell tower in southeast Europe.

== Gallery ==
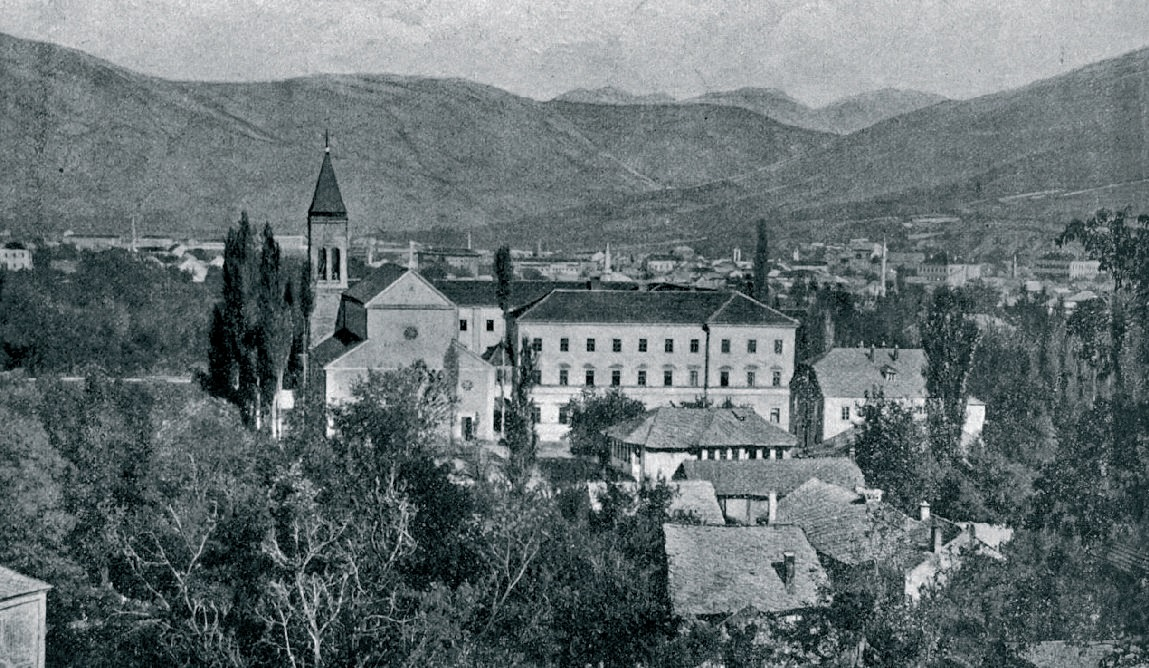
The old church in 1897

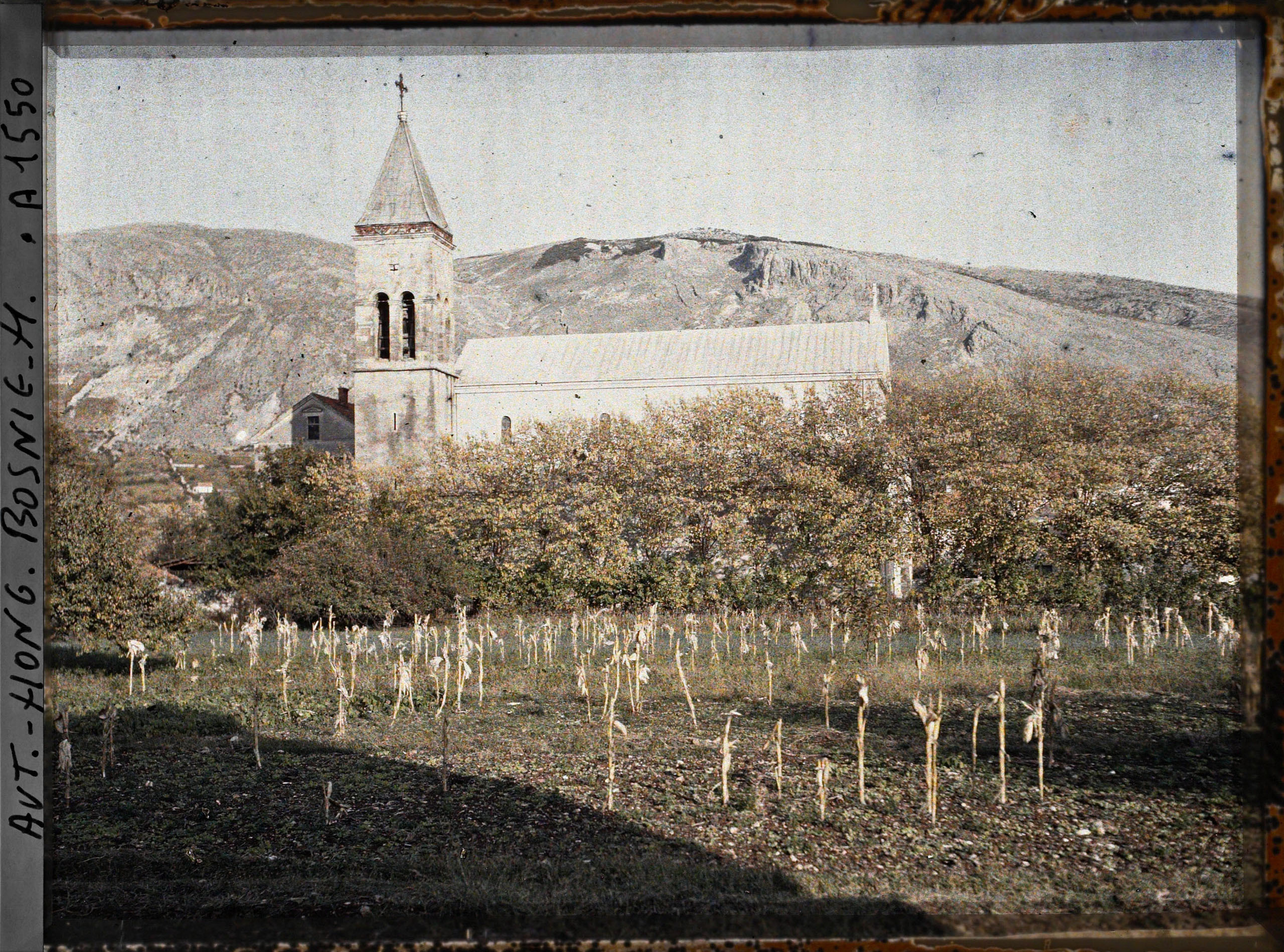
Old church in 1912, seen from east.

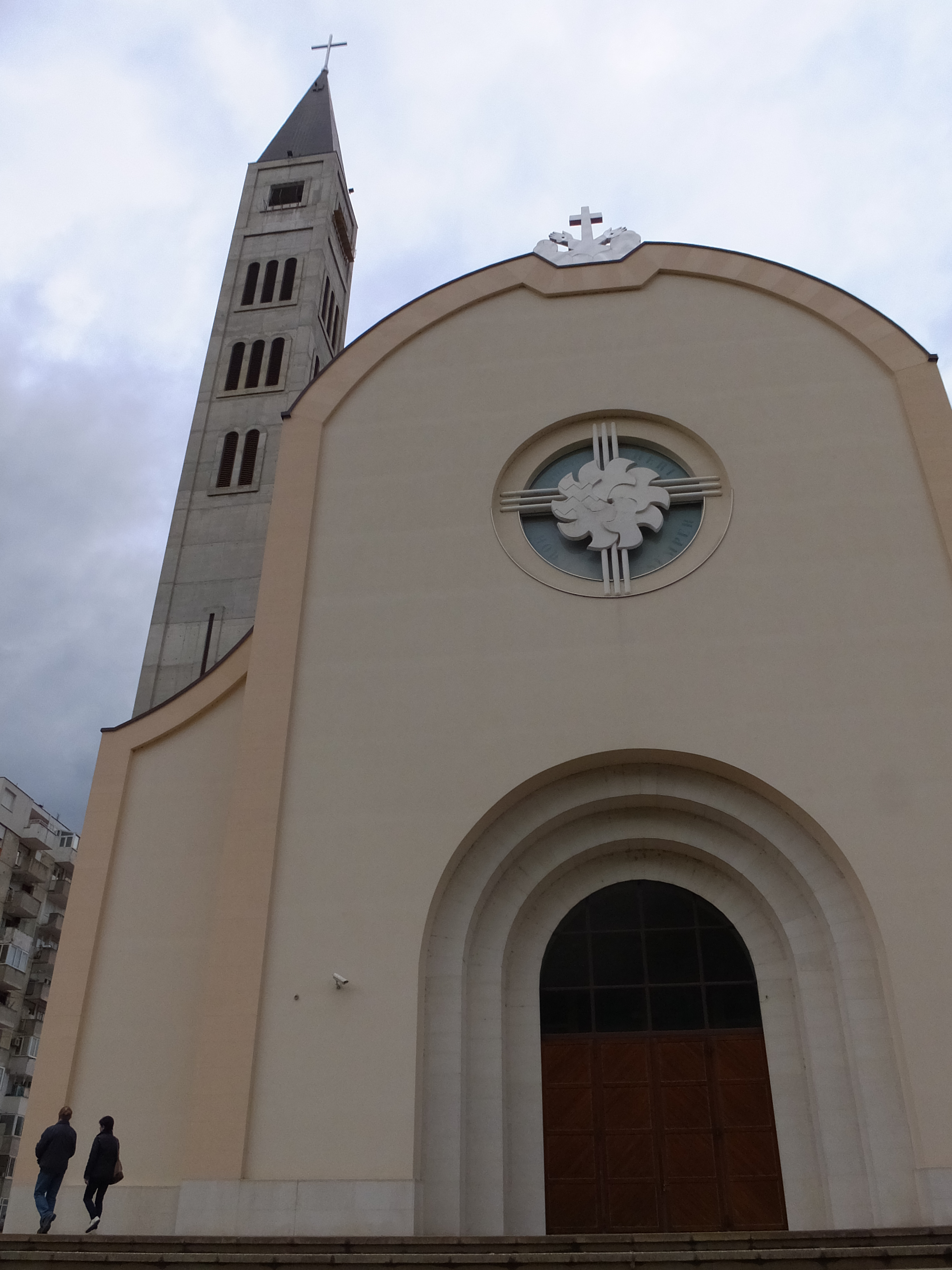
Church facade

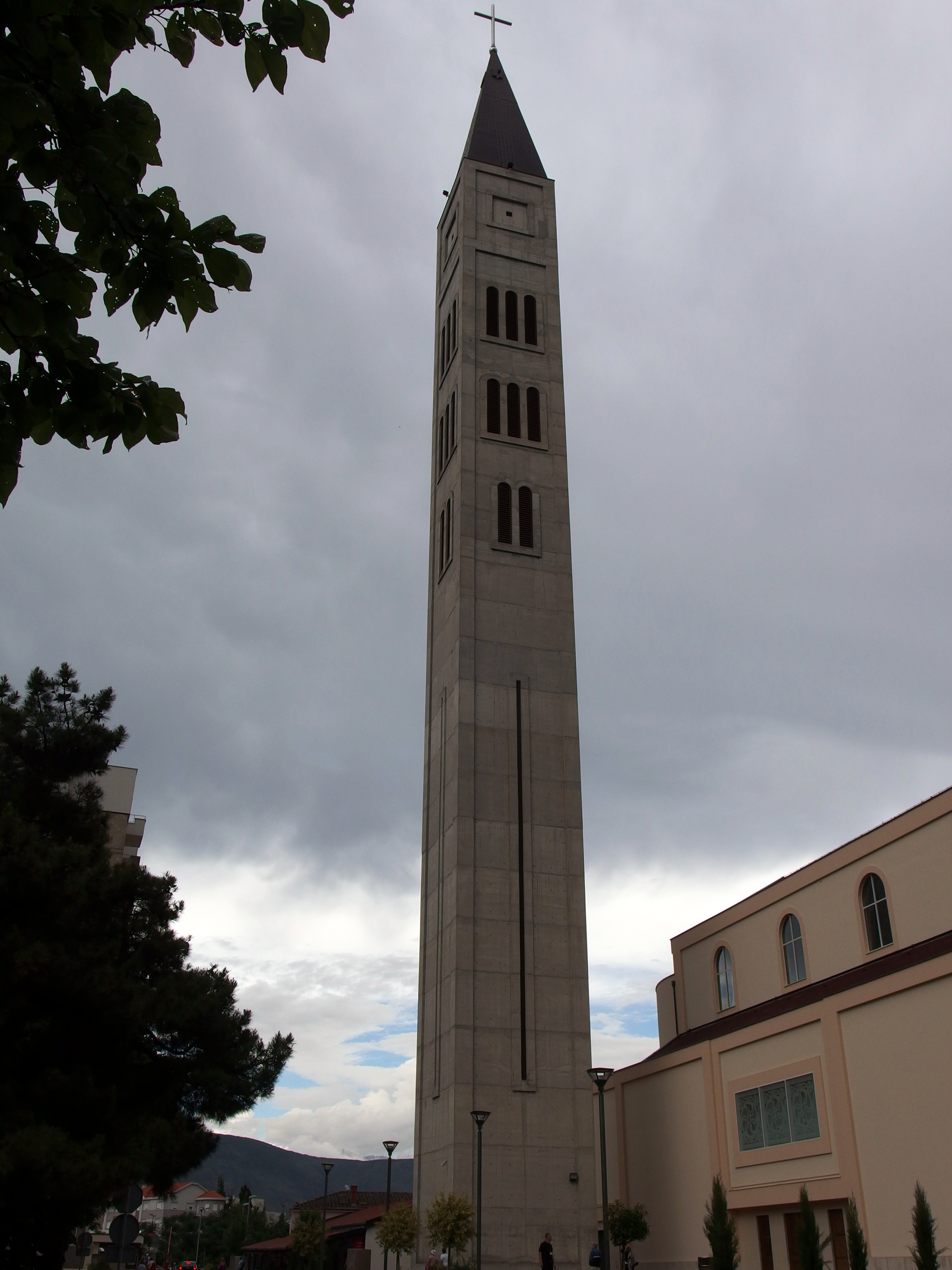
The bell tower

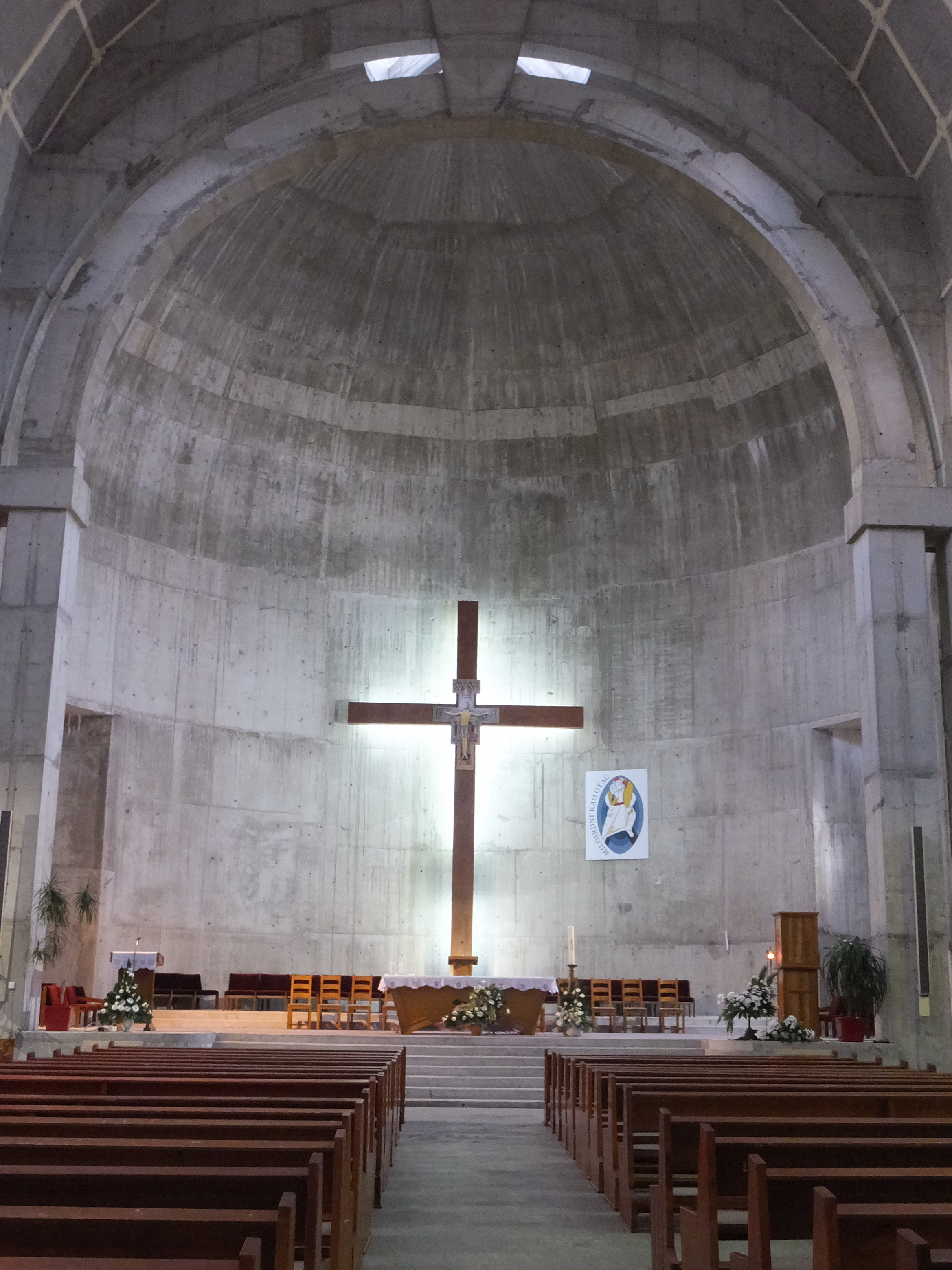
Inside of the church in 2016
