= Sts. Peter and St. Paul Church (Szczecin) =

Brick Gothic Polish Old Catholic church in Warsaw, Poland

Coordinates: 53°25′41″N 14°33′31″E

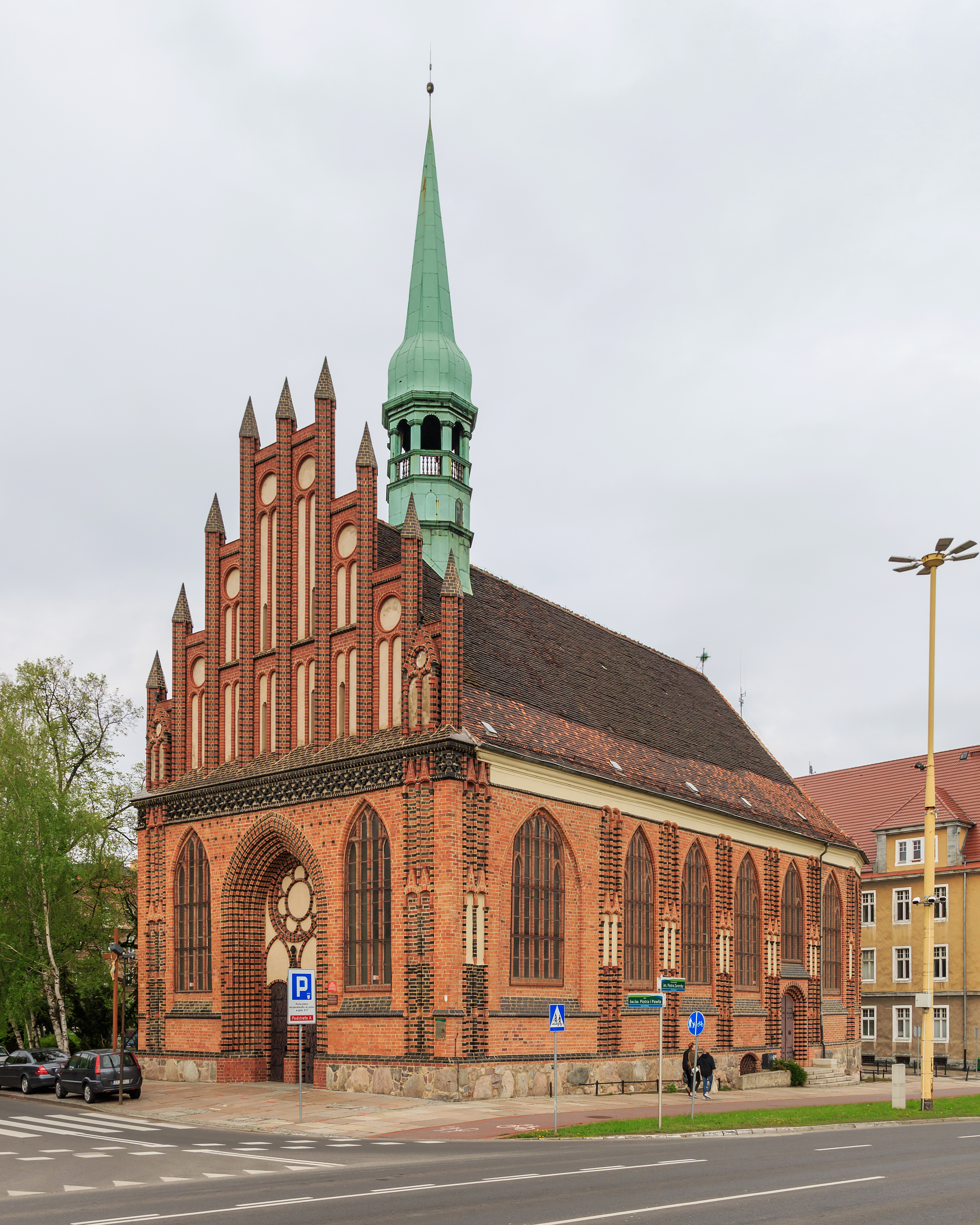
- The church in 2017.

- Location in Poland
- Location: 4/5 Sts. Peter and Paul Square
- Country: Poland
- Denomination: Polish Old Catholic
- Sui iuris church: Polish-Catholic Church in the Republic of Poland

History
- Status: Active
- Dedication: Saint Peter; Saint Paul

Architecture
- Functional status: Parish church
- Style: Brick Gothic
- Completed: 1702

Administration
- Archdiocese: Wrocław
- Deanery: Pomeranian and Greater Poland
- Parish: Sts. Peter and St. Paul

The Sts. Peter and St. Paul Church (Polish: Kościół św. Piotra i Pawła; German: St.-Peter-und-Paul-Kirche) is a Brick Gothic Polish Old Catholic parish church in Szczecin, Poland, within the Downtown district. It is placed at 4 and 5 Sts. Peter and Paul Square, at the corner of Castle Route and Tadeusz Mazowiecki Street, within the neighbourhood of Old Town. The first wooden church was built at the location in 1124, being founded by Otto of Bamberg as a seat of a Roman Catholic parish. A new brick church was built in its place in 1425, and in 1534, the parish denomination was changed to the Lutheranism. The building was destroyed in 1677 by artillery bombardment, while the city was under a siege during the Scanian War. It was rebuilt in 1702. Since 1945, the building is the seat of the parish of St. Peter and St. Paul, belonging to the Polish-Catholic Church in the Republic of Poland. The parish is dedicated to Saint Peter and Saint Paul, who, in the Christian theology, were the apostles who spread the teachings of Jesus Christ in the first-century AD. Saint Peter was also the first Pope, the leader of the Catholic Church.

== History ==
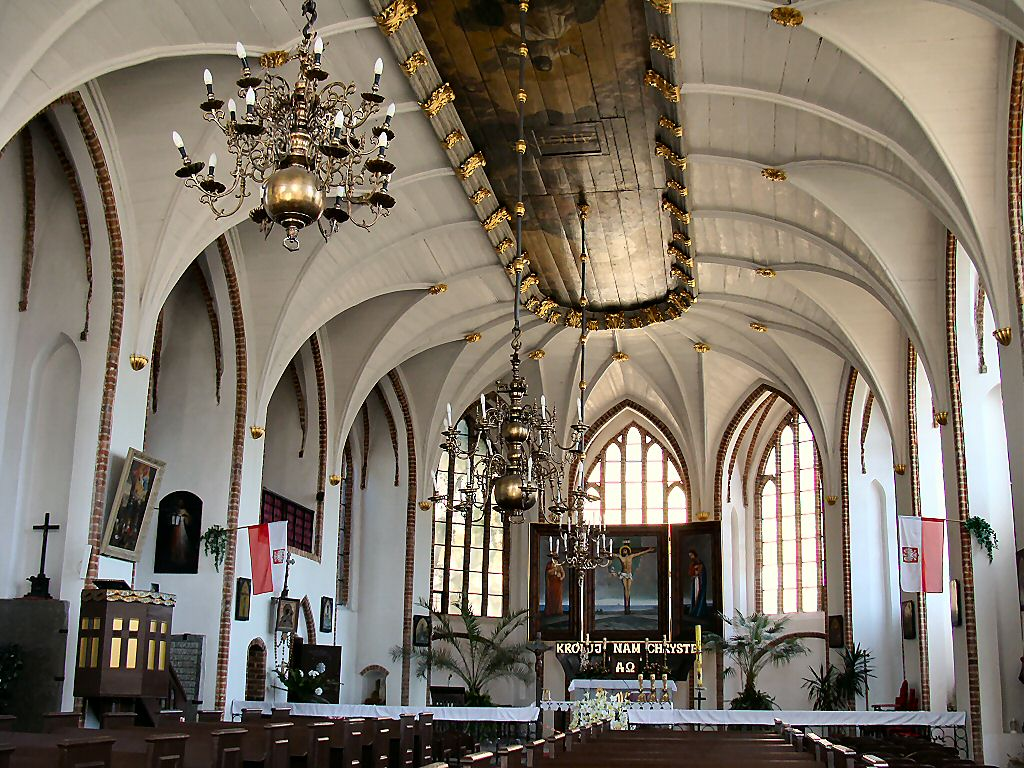
The church interior, completed in 1702.

The first wooden Roman Catholic church building was built at the location in 1124, being founded by Otto of Bamberg, who arrived to Szczecin with a mission to convert the region into Christianity. It was most likely the oldest religious building in the city. The church was burned down by Danish raiders in 1189, and a new brick building was constructed in its place between 1223 and 1237. In 1268, its parish was expanded to include the nearby villages of Grabowo, Golęcino, and Niemierzyn.

In 1425, a new church building begun begin constructed in its place, being designed in the Brick Gothic style, inspired on works by architect Hinrich Brunsberg. The façade and the interior were decorated with a series of corbel mascarons taking form of faces of the contemporary residents of Szczecin. Originally, they held a series of sculptures, which do not survive to the present day. In 1460, its west wing was elongated, and expanded with a tower. In 1534, the parish denomination was changed to the Lutheranism. The tower was deconstructed in 1556, and the west wall was remodeled. In 1602, the building was topped with a ridge turret.

The building was destroyed in 1677 by the artillery bombardment, while the city was under a siege during the Scanian War. Its reconstruction lasted until 1702. It was rebuilt as an aisleless church without rib vaults and pillars. A wooden ceiling was modeled to resemblance rib vaults. In 1703, local painter Philipp Ernst Eichner decorated it with a large oil ceiling painting, depicting three scenes of the Christian eschatology. In 1817, all Gothic elements were removed from the building during renovations. In 1901, Gothic Revival decorative elements were added to the western façade, including pinnacles at the top.

On 11 September 1945, the church became a seat of a Polish Old Catholic parish of the Polish-Catholic Church in the Republic of Poland. On 30 July 1955, the building was placed on the voivodeship heritage list. In 2009, a crypt was discovered in the building's underground, most likely containing graves of members of the House of Griffin or other influential higher class individuals.

== Design and interior ==
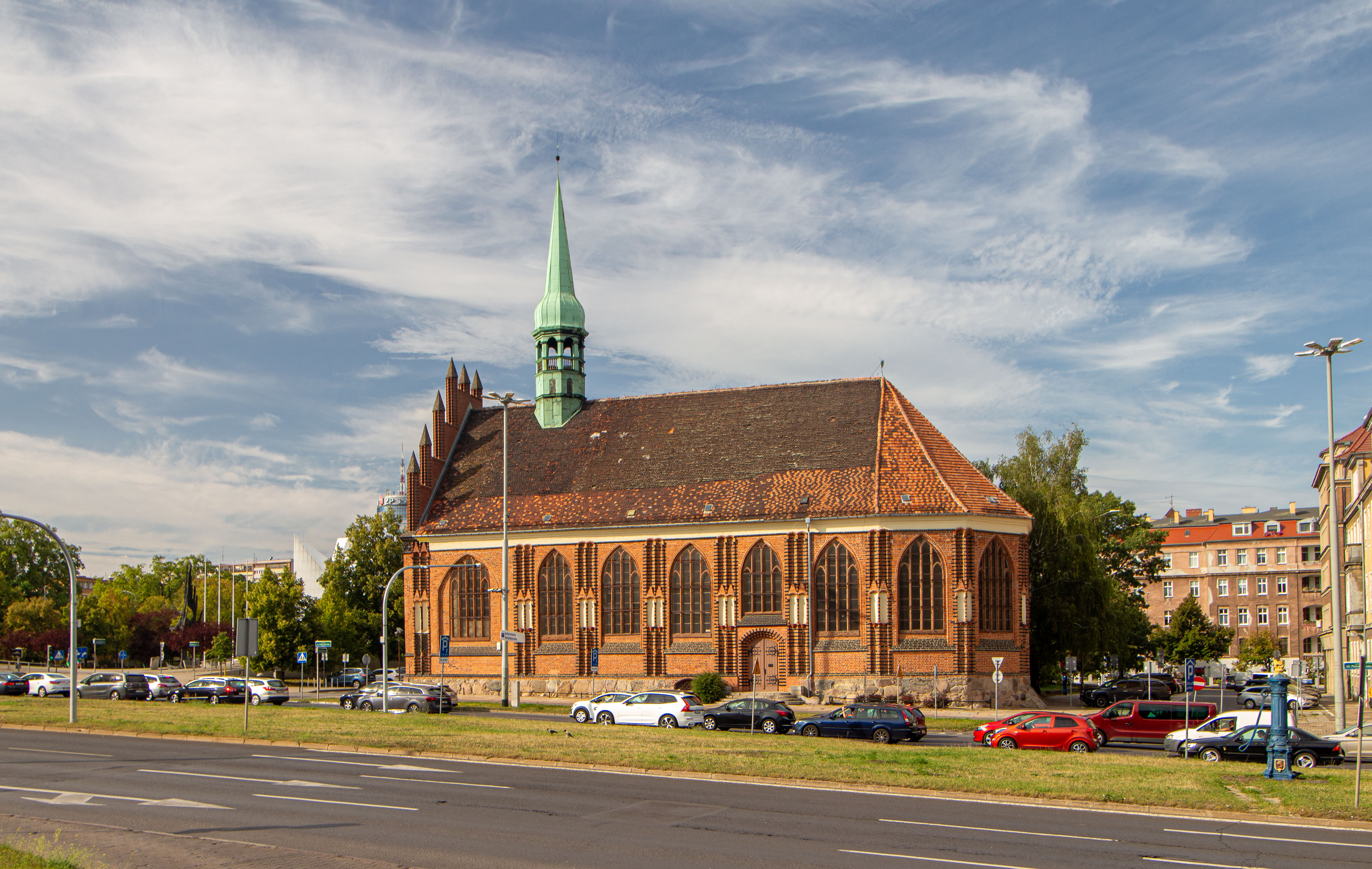
The southern side of the church

The church is a Brick Gothic building with a long west wing and short east wing, and a tall bell tower, with a historic bell from 1677. Its western façade is topped with pinnacles. The northern façade features an alms collection point from the first half of the 15th century, imbedded into the wall, with a hole for donations. On both sides, it is surrounded by two limestone tables with reliefs depicting Saint Peter and Saint Paul, dating to the late 16th century. The exterior and the interior walls of the church are decorated with the 15th-century corbel mascarons taking form of faces of contemporary residents of Szczecin. Originally, they held a series of sculptures, which do not survive to the present day. The interior is aisleless, with a wooden ceiling stylised to resemble rib vaults. Its entire length is decorated with an oil ceiling painting from 1703 by Philipp Ernst Eichner. It depicts three scenes of the Christian eschatology, being the apocalypse, the Last Judgment, and the saved souls in the Heaven. It has the length of 24 m, and the width of 4 m. The interior also features the a Baroque painting of Jesus Christ, polychromatic decorations from 1702, chandeliers from the 16ht century, donated by the House of Habsburg, and a collection of tombstone slabs from the 16th and 17th centuries. It also includes three sixteen-branched candlesticks dating to 1661, 1702, and 1703, four candlesticks from the 18th century, and five candlesticks from the 19th century. One of its chapels has a place dedicated in memory to the victims of the Auschwitz concentration camp in the Second World War.

== Gallery ==
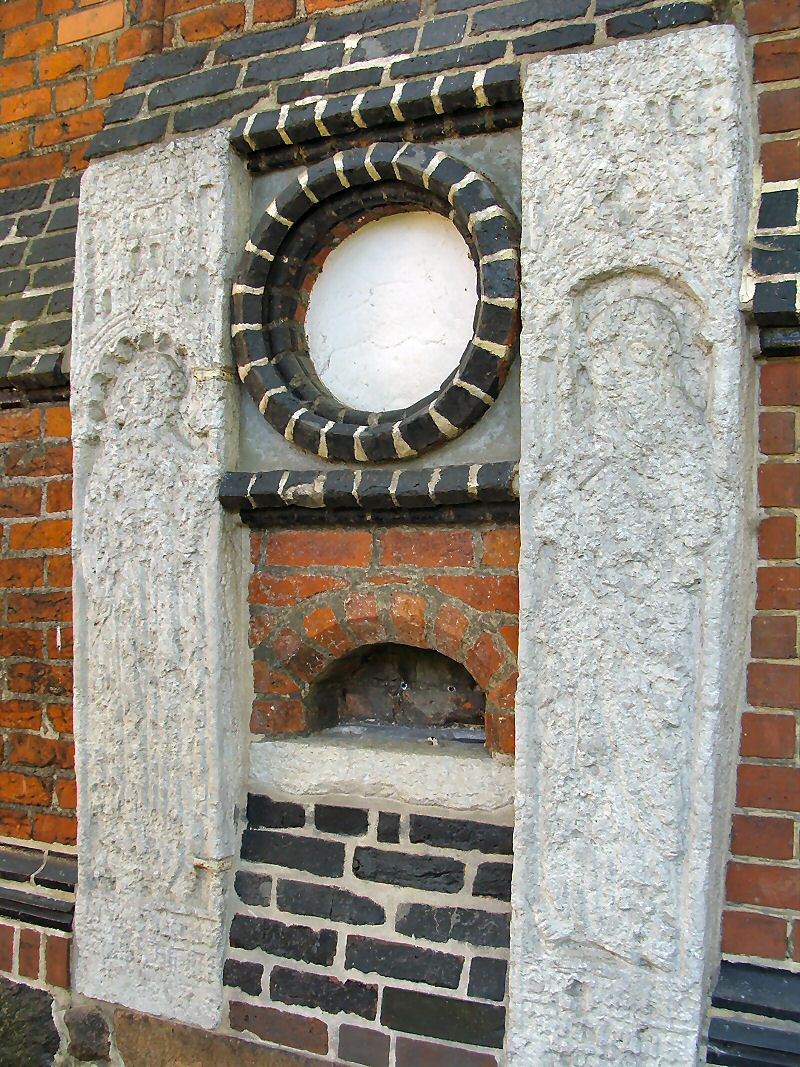
The alms collection point from the 15th century, with limestone relies of Saint Peter and Saint Paul from the 16th century.

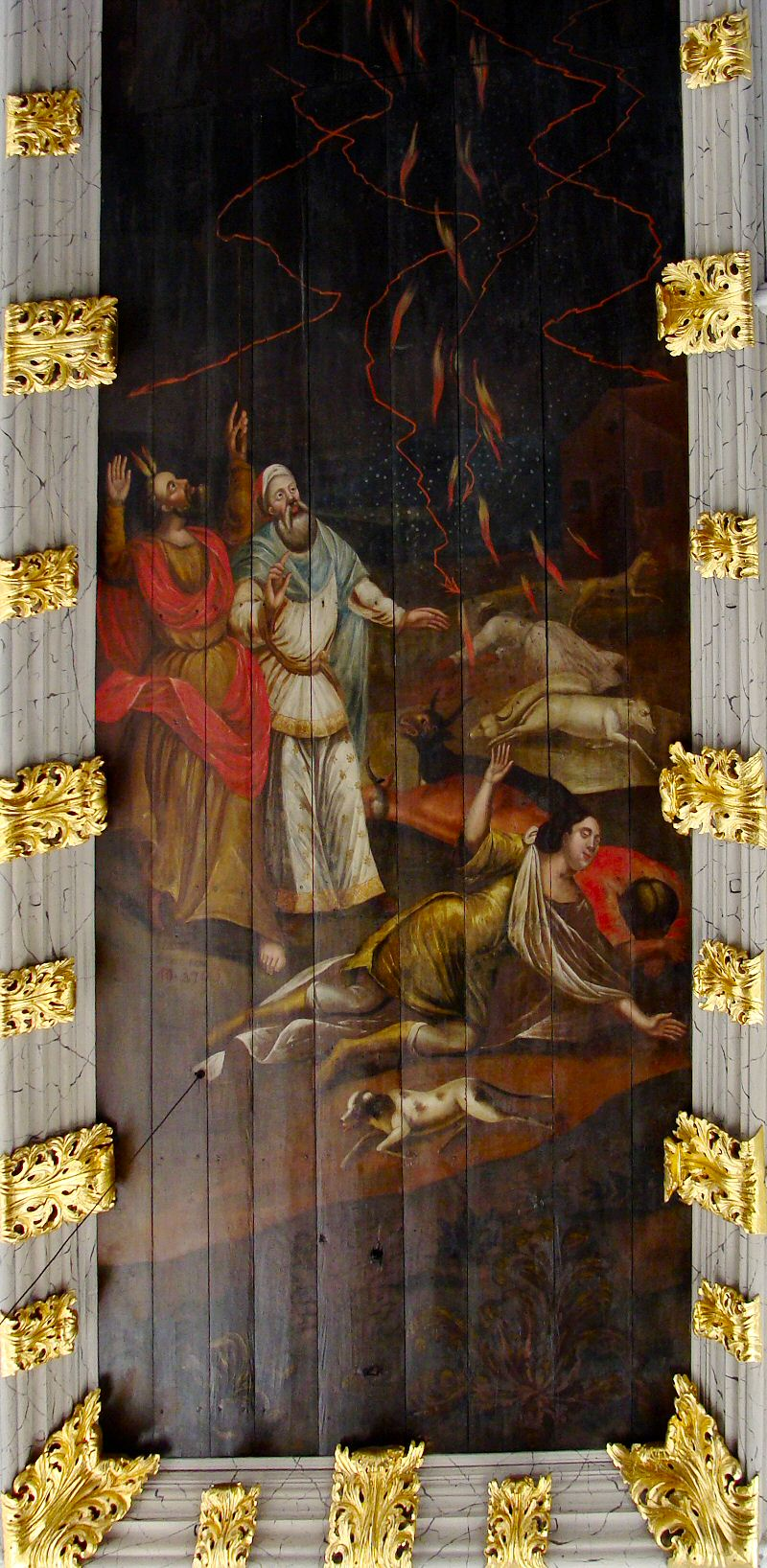
The first scene of the 1703 oil ceiling painting by Philipp Ernst Eichner, depicting the apocalypse in the Christian eschatology.

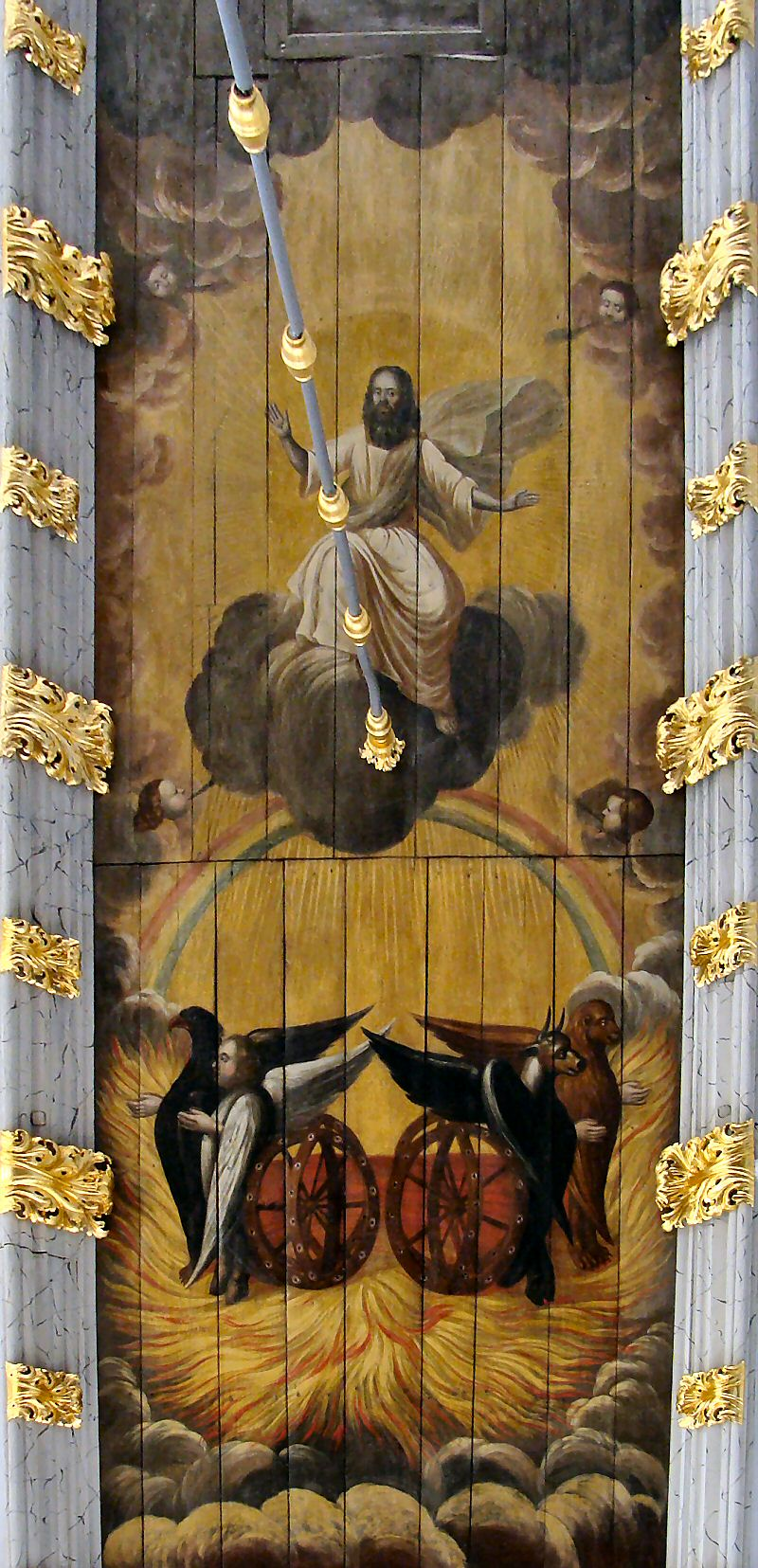
The second scene of the 1703 oil ceiling painting by Philipp Ernst Eichner, depicting the Last Judgment.

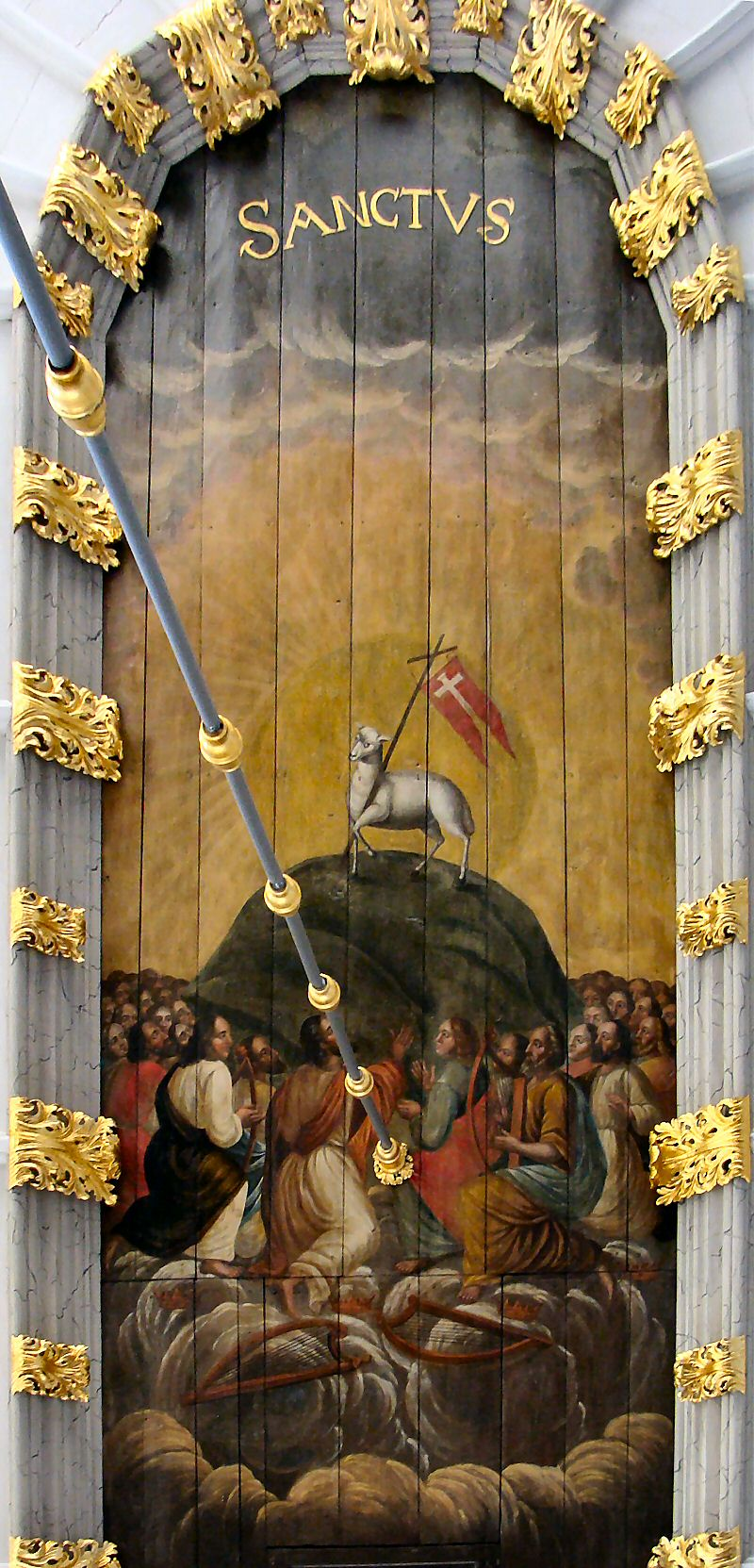
The third scene of the 1703 oil ceiling painting by Philipp Ernst Eichner, depicting the Heaven.

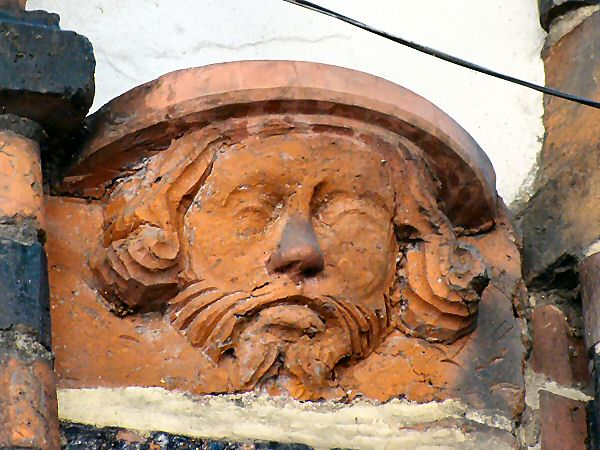
One of the 15th-century corbel mascarons, depicting the face of a contemporary resident of Szczecin.
