= St. Paul's Church =

St. Paul's Church or St Paul's Church or any variation thereof may refer to:

== Australia ==
- St Paul's Church, Adelaide, South Australia
- St Paul's Uniting Church, Mackay, Queensland
- St Paul's Church, Manuka, Australian Capital Territory
- Church of St Paul, Talbingo, New South Wales

== Belgium ==
- St. Paul's Church, Antwerp

== Canada ==
- St. Paul's, Bloor Street, Toronto, Ontario
- St. Paul's Church (Halifax), Canada's oldest Protestant church
- St. Paul's Eastern United Church, Ottawa, Ontario
- St. Paul's Presbyterian Church (Peterborough, Ontario)
- St. Paul's Presbyterian Church (Leaskdale), Ontario
- St. Paul's Anglican Church (Dawson City), a National Historic Site of Canada

== Chile ==
- St. Paul's Anglican Church (Valparaíso)

== China ==
- St. Paul's Church, Nanjing

== Denmark ==
- St. Paul's Church, Aarhus
- St. Paul's Church, Bornholm
- St. Paul's Church, Copenhagen
- St. Paul's Church, Hadsten

== Finland ==
- St. Paul's Church, Helsinki

== France ==
- Basilique Saint-Paul de Narbonne
- Église Saint-Paul-des-Champs, Paris
- Église Saint-Paul de Lyon
- Saint-Paul-Saint-Louis, Paris
- St. Paul's Church, Strasbourg

== Germany ==
- St. Paul's Church, Frankfurt am Main, location of the 1849 German National Convention
- Paulinerkirche, Leipzig, a destroyed church in Leipzig

== Hong Kong ==
- St. Paul's Church (Hong Kong)

== India ==
- St. Paul's Church, Bangalore
- St. Paul's Church, Diu, a Portuguese colonial church in Diu
- St. Paul's Church, Landour, an Anglican church in Landour Cantonment, Uttarakhand State
- St. Paul's Church, Mangalore

== Indonesia ==
- St. Paul's Church, Jakarta, another name for Gereja Paulus Jakarta

== Iran ==
- St. Paul Church, New Julfa
- St. Paul Church, Tehran

== Ireland ==
- St. Paul's Church, Banagher, County Offaly
- St. Paul's Church, Bray, County Wicklow
- St. Paul's Church, Dublin
- St. Paul's Church, Mullingar

== Isle of Man ==
- St Paul's, Ramsey, one of Isle of Man's Registered Buildings

== Israel ==
- St. Paul's Church (Jerusalem)

== Italy ==
- St. Paul's Church, Brugherio
- St. Paul's Church, Mirabello
- St. Paul's Within the Walls, Rome

== Macao ==
- Ruins of St. Paul's, the ruins of what was the 17th-century Cathedral of St. Paul, also called the St Paul's Church

== Malaysia ==
- St. Paul's Church, Malacca

== Malta ==
- St Paul's Church, Cospicua
- Collegiate church of St Paul, Rabat
- St Paul's Church, Munxar
- St Paul's Church, Safi
- Collegiate Parish Church of St Paul's Shipwreck, Valletta

== Monaco ==
- St. Paul Church, Monaco

== New Zealand ==
- Old St Paul's, Wellington
- St Paul's Church, Auckland
- St Paul's Church, Buckland
- St Paul's Church, Christchurch
- St Paul's Church, Hairini

== Norway ==
- Paulus Church, Oslo

== Pakistan ==
- St. Paul's Church, Manora, Karachi
- St. Paul's Church, Rawalpindi

== Philippines ==
- Cathedral of Saints Peter and Paul, Calbayog City, Samar
- Conversion of St. Paul Church, Bingawan, Iloilo
- Metropolitan Cathedral and Parish of the Conversion of Saint Paul, Vigan, Ilocos Sur
- Saint Paul the Apostle Parish, Quezon City, Metro Manila
- Saints Peter and Paul Church, Hinunangan, Southern Leyte
- Saints Peter and Paul Church, Ormoc City, Leyte
- Saints Peter and Paul Church, Paranas, Samar
- San Pablo Mission Station, San Pablo, Manapla, Negros Occidental
- St. Paul the Apostle Church, Cauayan, Negros Occidental
- St. Paul the Apostle Church, Sagrada, Buhi, Camarines Sur
- St. Paul the Apostle Parish Church, Inabanga, Bohol
- St. Paul the Apostle Parish Church, Lugo, Borbon, Cebu
- Sts. Peter and Paul Church, Bantayan, Cebu
- Sts. Peter and Paul the Apostle Church, Barotac Viejo, Iloilo

== Portugal ==
- St Paul's Church, Braga

== Singapore ==
- St. Paul's Church, an Anglican church in Kovan, Singapore

== Sri Lanka ==
- St. Paul's Church, Kandy
- St. Paul's Church, Milagiriya

== Sweden ==
- St. Paul's Church, Mariatorget, Stockholm
- St. Paul's Church, Malmö

== Switzerland ==
- St. Paul's Church, Basel
- St. Paul's Church, Bern

== Syria ==
- Chapel of Saint Paul, Damascus

== Turkey ==
- St. Paul's Church, Antakya
- Saint Paul's Church, Tarsus

== United Kingdom ==
=== England ===
- St Paul's Cathedral, London
- Old St Paul's Cathedral, London
- St Paul's Church, Adlington, Lancashire
- Old St Peter and St Paul's Church, Albury, Surrey
- St Paul's Church, Bedford, Bedfordshire
- St Peter and St Paul's Church, Bolton-by-Bowland, Lancashire
- St Paul's Church, Boughton, Chester
- St Paul's, Bow Common, London
- St Paul's Church, Brighton
- St Paul's Church, Bristol
- St Paul's Church, Brookhouse, Lancashire
- St Paul's Church, Burslem, Staffordshire
- St Paul's, Burton upon Trent, Staffordshire
- St Paul's Church, Bury, Greater Manchester
- St Paul's, Cambridge, Cambridgeshire
- St Paul's Church, Clapham, London
- St Paul's Church, Constable Lee, Lancashire
- St Paul's, Covent Garden, London (also known as the 'Actors' Church')
- St Paul's, Deptford, London
- St Paul's Church, Dover, Kent
- St Paul's Church, East Ham, London
- St Paul's Church, Farington, Lancashire
- St Paul's Church, Fazeley, Staffordshire
- St Paul's Church, Fulney, Spalding, Lincolnshire
- St Paul's Church, Gulworthy, Devon
- St Paul's, Hammersmith, London
- St Paul's Church, Hamstead, Birmingham
- St Paul's Church, Harringay, London
- St Paul's Church, Helsby, Cheshire
- Old St Paul's Church, Hoddlesden, Lancashire
- St Paul's Church, Hooton, Cheshire
- St Paul's Church, Hyde, Greater Manchester
- St Paul's Church, Kewstoke, Somerset
- St Paul's Church, Knightsbridge, London
- St Paul's Church, Lindale, Cumbria
- Church of St Paul, Liverpool, Merseyside
- St Paul's Church, Longridge, Lancashire
- St Paul's Church, Macclesfield, Cheshire
- St Paul's Church, Marston, Cheshire (demolished)
- St James' and St Paul's Church, Marton, Cheshire
- St Paul's Church, New Southgate, London
- St Paul's Church, Newport, Isle of Wight
- St Paul's Church, Over Tabley, Cheshire
- St Paul's Church, Oxford
- St Paul's Church, Preston, Lancashire
- St Peter and St Paul's Church, Preston Deanery, Northamptonshire
- St Paul's Church, Ramsbottom, Bury, Greater Manchester
- St Paul's Church, Rusthall, Kent
- St Paul's Church, Salisbury, Wiltshire
- St Paul's Church, Seacombe, Merseyside
- St Paul's Church, Scotforth, Lancaster, Lancashire
- St Paul's Church, Shadwell, London
- Church of St Paul, Shipley, Yorkshire
- St Paul's Church, Stamford, Lincolnshire
- St Paul's Church, Gatten, Shanklin, Isle of Wight
- St Paul's Church and Centre, Norton Lees, Sheffield, Yorkshire
- St Paul's Church, Wordsworth Avenue, Sheffield, Yorkshire
- St Paul's Church, Skelmersdale, Lancashire
- St Paul's Church, Tintagel, Cornwall
- Church of St Paul with St Luke, Tranmere, Merseyside
- St Paul's Church, Tupsley, Herefordshire
- St Paul's Church, Walsall, West Midlands
- St Paul's Church, West Derby, Liverpool, Merseyside
- St Paul's Church, Winlaton, Tyne and Wear
- St Paul's Church, Witherslack, Cumbria
- St Paul's Church, Wood Green, West Midlands
- St Paul Parish Church, Grange-over-Sands, Cumbria
- St Paul and St Stephen's Church, Gloucester, Gloucestershire

=== Scotland ===
- St Paul's Church, Perth
- St Paul's Parish Church, Edinburgh
- Old St. Paul's, Edinburgh
- St Paul's (Outer High) Parish Church, now St Paul's Building, Glasgow

=== Wales ===
- St Paul's Church, Colwyn Bay, North Wales
- St Paul's Church, Grangetown, Cardiff
- St Paul's Church, Newport, Wales

== United States ==
=== California ===
- St. Paul's Catholic Church (San Francisco)

=== Colorado ===
- St. Paul's Church (Marble, Colorado)

=== District of Columbia ===
- Church of St. Paul's, K Street (Washington, D.C.)
- Saint Paul African Union Methodist Church
- St. Paul's Lutheran Church (Washington, D.C.)

=== Florida ===
- Basilica of St. Paul (Daytona Beach, Florida)

=== Georgia ===
- St. Paul United Methodist Church (Atlanta)
- Saint Paul's Church (Augusta, Georgia)

=== Illinois ===
- St. Paul Catholic Church (Highland, Illinois)

=== Iowa ===
- St. Paul's Catholic Church (Burlington, Iowa)
- St. Paul United Methodist Church (Cedar Rapids, Iowa)
- St. Paul Lutheran Church (Davenport, Iowa)
- St. Paul's Episcopal Church (Durant, Iowa)
- Cathedral Church of Saint Paul (Des Moines)
- St. Paul's Episcopal Church (Harlan, Iowa)

=== Maryland ===
- Saint Paul Catholic Church (Ellicott City, Maryland)
- St. Paul's Parish Church (Brandywine, Maryland)
- St. Paul's Chapel (Crownsville, Maryland)
- St. Paul's Church (Fairlee, Maryland)

=== Massachusetts ===
- The Church of St. Paul (Harvard Square)
- Cathedral Church of St. Paul, Boston
- Saint Paul's Church, Chapel, and Parish House, Brookline
- St. Paul's Church (Dedham, Massachusetts)

=== Missouri ===
- St. Paul Catholic Church (Center, Missouri)
- St. Paul's Church (New Melle, Missouri)

=== New York ===
- St. Paul's Church (Brownville, New York)
- St. Paul's Church (Chittenango, New York)
- Saint Paul's Church National Historic Site, Mount Vernon
- St. Paul's Church (Owego, New York)
- St. Paul's Church and Cemetery (Paris Hill, New York)
- St. Paul the Apostle Church (Manhattan)
- St. Paul's Chapel, New York City

=== North Carolina ===
- St. Paul's Church and Cemetery (Newton, North Carolina)

=== Ohio ===
- St. Paul Church (Over the Rhine), Cincinnati
- St. Paul Church Historic District, Cincinnati
- St. Paul Church South Bass Island, Put-in-Bay

=== Pennsylvania ===
- St. Paul's Episcopal Church (Exton, Pennsylvania), also known as St. Paul's Church (and listed as such on the National Register of Historic Places)
- St. Paul's Church (Chester, Pennsylvania)

=== Rhode Island ===
- St. Paul's Church (North Kingstown, Rhode Island)
- Saint Paul Church (Cranston, Rhode Island)
- Saint Paul's Church (Pawtucket, Rhode Island)

=== Texas ===
- St. Paul's Episcopal Church (Greenville, Texas)

=== Virginia ===
- St. Paul's Episcopal Church (Alexandria, Virginia)
- St. Paul's Episcopal Church (King George, Virginia), also known as St. Paul's Church (and listed as such on the National Register of Historic Places (NRHP))
- St. Paul's Church (Lynchburg, Virginia)
- Saint Paul's Episcopal Church (Norfolk, Virginia), also known as Saint Paul's Church (and listed as such on the NRHP)
- Saint Paul's Church (Petersburg, Virginia)
- St. Paul's Episcopal Church (Richmond, Virginia), also known as St. Paul's Church (and listed as such on the NRHP)
- St. Paul's Catholic Church (Portsmouth, Virginia)

== See also ==
- Old St. Paul's (disambiguation)
- St. Paul A.M.E. Church (disambiguation)
- St. Paul the Apostle Church (disambiguation)
- St. Paul's Basilica (disambiguation)
- St. Paul's Cathedral (disambiguation)
- St. Paul's Anglican Church (disambiguation)
- St. Paul's Catholic Church (disambiguation)
- St. Paul's Chapel (disambiguation)
- St. Paul's Church and Cemetery (disambiguation)
- St. Paul's Episcopal Church (disambiguation)
- St. Paul's Lutheran Church (disambiguation)
- St. Paul's Methodist Church (disambiguation)
- St. Paul's Parish Church (disambiguation)
- St. Paul's Reformed Church (disambiguation)
- St. Peter and St. Paul's Church (disambiguation)
