= St. Paul's Lutheran Church =

St. Paul's Lutheran Church may refer to:

== Australia ==
- St Paul's Lutheran Church, Hahndorf, South Australia

== Latvia ==
- St. Paul's Lutheran Church, Riga

== United States ==
(by state, then city)

- St. Paulus Lutheran Church, formerly listed on the National Register of Historic Places in San Francisco, California
- Saint Paul Lutheran Community of Faith in Denver, Colorado, listed on the National Register of Historic Places as St. Paul's English Evangelical Lutheran Church
- St. Paulus Evangelisch Lutherischen Gemeinde, listed on the National Register of Historic Places in Jonesboro, Illinois
- St. Paul Lutheran Church (Davenport, Iowa)
- St. Paul's Lutheran Church (Ashland, Kentucky)
- St. Paul Lutheran Church (Mansura, Louisiana), listed on the National Register of Historic Places
- St. Paul's Evangelical Lutheran Church & Parsonage, listed on the National Register of Historic Places in Minneota, Minnesota
- St. Paul's Church (New Melle, Missouri), also known as St. Paul's Lutheran Church
- St. Paul's Lutheran Church, Parsonage and Cemetery, listed on the National Register of Historic Places in Dutchess County, New York
- St. Paul's Evangelical Lutheran Church (Berne, New York), listed on the National Register of Historic Places in Albany County, New York
- St. Paul's Evangelical Lutheran Church (Liberty, New York), listed on the National Register of Historic Places in Sullivan County, New York
- St. Paul's Lutheran Church (Oak Hill, New York), listed on the National Register of Historic Places in Greene County, New York
- St. Paul's (Zion's) Evangelical Lutheran Church in Red Hook, New York
- St. Paul's Lutheran Church Historic District, listed on the National Register of Historic Places in Schoharie County, New York
- St. Paul's Lutheran Church (Wurtemburg, New York), listed on the National Register of Historic Places in Dutchess County, New York
- St. Paul's Church and Cemetery (Newton, North Carolina), also known as St. Paul's Lutheran Church
- St. Paul's Lutheran Church (Hazen, North Dakota), listed on the National Register of Historic Places in Mercer County, North Dakota
- St. Paul Lutheran Church and Cemetery (Union County, South Dakota), listed on the National Register of Historic Places
- St. Paul's Lutheran Church (Washington, D.C.)
- Hope Church (Charleston, West Virginia), National Register of Historic Places historic district contributing property originally built for St. Paul's Evangelical Lutheran Church in that city
- St. Paul Evangelical Lutheran Church (Appleton, Wisconsin), listed on the National Register of Historic Places in Appleton, Wisconsin

== See also ==
- St. Paul's Church (disambiguation)
