= St. Paul's Cemetery =

St. Paul's Cemetery may refer to:

- Old Saint Paul's Cemetery, Baltimore, Maryland
- St. Paul's Lutheran Church, Parsonage and Cemetery, Dutchess County, New York
- St. Paul's German Presbyterian Church and Cemetery, Elmont, New York
- St. Paul's Church and Cemetery (Paris Hill, New York)
- St. Paul's Church and Cemetery (Newton, North Carolina)
- St. Paul's Episcopal Church and Cemetery, Wilkesboro, North Carolina
- St. Paul's Union Church and Cemetery, Schuylkill County, Pennsylvania
- St. Paul's Cemetery (Alexandria, Virginia)

== See also ==
- St. Paul's Church (disambiguation)
