= St. Paul's Catholic Church =

St. Paul('s) (Roman) Catholic Church may refer to:

Alphabetical by state

- St. Paul's Catholic Church (Birmingham, Alabama)
- St. Paul's Catholic Church (San Francisco), California
- St. Paul Catholic Church (Highland, Illinois)
- St. Paul's Catholic Church (Burlington, Iowa), a National Register of Historic Places (NRHP) contributing property
- Saint Paul Catholic Church (Ellicott City, Maryland)
- St. Paul Catholic Church (Center, Missouri), NRHP-listed
- St. Paul's Roman Catholic Church (New Bern, North Carolina), formerly NRHP-listed
- St. Paul's Catholic Church (Sharpsburg, Ohio), NRHP-listed in Mercer County
- St. Paul Roman Catholic Church (St. Paul, Oregon), NRHP-listed
- St. Paul's Catholic Church (Portsmouth, Virginia), NRHP-listed

== See also ==
- St. Paul's Cathedral (disambiguation)
- St. Paul's Church (disambiguation)
