= St. Paul's Church and Cemetery =

St. Paul's Church and Cemetery may refer to:

- St. Paul's Church and Cemetery (Newton, North Carolina), listed on the NRHP in North Carolina
- St. Paul's Church and Cemetery (Paris Hill, New York), listed on the NRHP in New York

== See also ==
- St. Paul's Church (disambiguation)
