= St. Paul's Methodist Church =

St. Paul's Methodist Church, and variations, including names with St. Paul, Episcopal or Protestant may refer to:

- St. Paul's Methodist Episcopal Church (Point Arena, California)
- St. Paul's Methodist Episcopal Church (Hartford, Connecticut)
- Old St. Paul's Methodist Episcopal Church (Odessa, Delaware), listed on the NRHP in Delaware
- St. Paul Methodist Episcopal Church (Rushville, Indiana)
- St. Paul United Methodist Church (Cedar Rapids, Iowa)
- St. Paul's Methodist Episcopal Church (Westover, Maryland)
- St. Paul's Methodist Protestant Church (Culbertson, Nebraska)
- St. Paul's Methodist Church (Oyster Bay, New York)
- St. Paul's Methodist Church (Little Rock, South Carolina)
- Church of St. Paul and St. Andrew (New York City), formerly St. Paul's Methodist Episcopal Church
- Saint Paul's Methodist Episcopal Church (Anniston, Alabama)

== See also ==
- St. Paul A.M.E. Church (disambiguation)
- St. Paul's United Methodist Church (disambiguation)
- St. Paul's Church (disambiguation)
