= St. Paul's Anglican Church =

St. Paul's Anglican Church may refer to:

== Australia ==
- St Paul's Anglican Church, Burwood, New South Wales
- St Paul's Anglican Church, Camperdown, Victoria
- St Paul's Anglican Church, Carlingford, New South Wales
- St Paul's Anglican Church, Castle Hill, New South Wales
- Old St Paul's Anglican Church, Deniliquin, New South Wales
- St Paul's Anglican Church, Cleveland, Queensland
- St Paul's Anglican Church, Clunes, Victoria
- St Paul's Anglican Church, East Brisbane, Queensland
- St Paul's Anglican Church, Geelong, Victoria
- St Paul's Anglican Church, Ipswich, Queensland
- St Paul's Anglican Church, Maryborough, Queensland
- St Paul's Anglican Church, Proserpine, Queensland

== Canada ==
- St. Paul's Anglican Church (Halifax, Nova Scotia), on the List of National Historic Sites of Canada
- St. Paul's Anglican Church (Dawson City), on the List of National Historic Sites of Canada
- St. Peter & St. Paul's Anglican Church (Ottawa)
- St. Paul's Anglican Church (Vancouver)

== Chile ==
- St. Paul's Anglican Church (Valparaíso), a National Monument of Chile

== Malaysia ==
- St. Paul's Anglican Church, Lingga

== New Zealand ==
- St Paul's Anglican Church, Papanui, Christchurch

== See also ==
- St. Paul's Church (disambiguation)
