= Graverobbers (film) =

- Promotional poster
- Directed by: Straw Weisman
- Written by: Straw Weisman
- Produced by: Lew Mishkin
- Starring: Elizabeth Mannino; David Myers Gregory; Lawrence Bockius; Jerry Rector; Judith Mayes; Kelvin Keraga
- Cinematography: Anghel Deca
- Edited by: Michael Spence
- Music by: Katherine Quittner
- Production companies: Films Around the World; Jaylo International Films; Filmworld International Productions; The Weisman Company
- Distributed by: Prism Entertainment
- Release date: March 8, 1990
- Running time: 93 minutes
- Country: United States
- Language: English

Graverobbers (also known as Dead Mate) is a 1988 American black comedy horror film written and directed by Straw Weisman, and starring Elizabeth Mannino, David Myers Gregory, Lawrence Bockius, Jerry Rector, Judith Mayes, and Kelvin Keraga. Its plot follows a waitress in a small town who marries an undertaker and soon finds he and his friends may be involved in disturbing activities at the local funeral home.

== Plot ==
In sleepy upstate New York, former New York City prostitute Nora Mae Edwards, who suffers with a sleep disorder, works the graveyard shift as a waitress in a local diner. One night, she meets John Henry Cox, a mysterious man who asks her to marry him. Nora impulsively agrees, resigning from her job at the diner and moving with him to the small town of Newbury, where John works as a mortician. The two have their wedding that night, attended by several pillars of the Newbury community.

Nora finds herself struggling to adjust to John's lifestyle, as his stately home is free of modern technology like television, and he keeps no clocks. After a young woman dies in a mysterious drowning accident, her brother, Evan Matthews arrives at the funeral home to identify the remains. Prior to her arrival at the funeral home, two of the Newbury ambulance drivers engage in necrophilia with the body. Later, Nora secretly watches in horror as John and the other townspeople send electrical currents through the dead woman's body before John declares she is "safe" and that they will not be able to contract AIDS.

After the funeral, Evan approaches Nora with his suspicions that something is awry in the town, and urges her not to allow John to get her near water. Nora questions her interpretation of events, unsure if what she witnessed was imagined or possibly a nightmare. That night, John offers Nora a warm bath to relax, which she reluctantly accepts despite Evan's warning. John attempts to drown Laura, but retracts, claiming he slipped and pushed her underneath the water.

In the middle of the night, Evan arrives and Nora leaves with him while John sleeps. The two visit the cemetery, where Evan shows Nora headstones of John's previous wives. They break into the crypt of Evan's sister and find it empty, confirming Evan's suspicion that John and the townspeople are graverobbers. Several townspeople and the two ambulance drivers, appearing in a zombie-like state, converge on the cemetery. Evan decapitates Morley, the funeral chauffeur with a shovel before apparently being murdered, and Nora stumbles upon a tombstone bearing her name before escaping.

The next morning, Nora is horrified to see the chauffeur apparently alive and well. Nora has an apparent nightmare in which John kills her in the embalming room, and awakens, unsure if the events she witnessed were real or imagined. To assuage her fears, John brings Nora to visit the Sheriff Porter, who assures her Evan is alive. Nora flees through the town, but finds the townspeople unwilling to help her. Using a payphone, she calls her former boss Donna, who agrees to come meet her at the funeral home.

Nora is pursued by John at the funeral home, and manages to flee in a hearse, striking and apparently killing Morley. On a country road, Morley reemerges chasing Nora on a motorcycle, his body disintegrating into a corpse-like zombie before he crashes. Moments later, Nora finds Evan alive and well in a casket in the back of the hearse. As the two approach a roadblock guarded by Sheriff Porter, Evan stops the hearse, revealing himself to now be one of the undead. Nora is attacked by John, posing as Donna in a wig, and forced into the casket. John, Evan, and Sheriff Porter return Nora to the funeral home, where they prepare to kill her. Suddenly, Nora awakens back at the diner, having revealed all of the prior events to have been a nightmare. When John and Morley enter the diner, Nora shoots both.

It is indicated that Nora got off on self-defense, while John and Morley survived the shooting and continue to operate the funeral home with Evan as their new employee.

== Cast ==
- Elizabeth Mannino as Nora Mae Edwards
- David Myers Gregory as John Henry Cox
- Lawrence Bockius as Sheriff Porter
- Judith Mayes as Emmaline Strickland
- Jerry Rector as Evan Matthews (as Adam Wahl)
- Kevin Scullin as Reverend Collins
- Kelvin Keraga as Morley the Chauffeur
- Kenneth Giek as Bill Billings
- Nevada Belle as Ma
- Kathleen Margo as Cicely Matthews
- Elizabeth Schram as Her Feet
- Marc Macaulay as Salesman
- Dawn Carpenter as Donna
- James Brummel as Jimmy, the Dishwasher
- Lars Hundere as Larry

== Production ==
Straw Weisman wrote the screenplay around 1985 while living in Los Angeles. The film was mostly shot in the Hudson River Valley in Croton-on-Hudson, Filming also took place in Red Hook at St. Paul's Lutheran Church, the Rockefeller and Hand Funeral Home, and the White Funeral Home in Rhinebeck. Principal photography for the film was underway in April 1988.

== Release ==
Prism Home Video released the film on VHS and Betamax under the alternate title Dead Mate on March 7, 1990.

In June 2018, the film was restored in 2K and released on DVD and Blu-ray by Vinegar Syndrome.
