= St. Paul's Reformed Church =

St. Paul's Reformed Church may refer to:

- St. Paul's Reformed Episcopal Church in Chicago, Illinois
- St. Paul's Reformed Church (Navarre, Ohio)
- St. Paul's Reformed Church (Startown, North Carolina)

== See also ==
- St. Paul's Church (disambiguation)
