= Old St. Paul's =

Old St Paul's may refer to:

== United Kingdom ==
- Old St Paul's Cathedral in London, England, destroyed in 1666
  - Old St. Paul's (novel), a novel by William Harrison Ainsworth set in the cathedral
  - Old St. Paul's (film), a 1914 British silent historical film based on the novel
- Old Saint Paul's, Edinburgh, a Scottish Episcopal Church church in Scotland
- Old St Paul's Church, Hoddlesden, a former church in Lancashire, England

== North America ==
- St. Paul's Episcopal Church (Baltimore, Maryland) or Old St. Paul's Church, an Episcopal church
  - Old Saint Paul's Cemetery, the associated cemetery
- Old St. Paul's Methodist Episcopal Church, a former church in Odessa, Delaware

== Oceania ==
- Old St. Paul's, Wellington, a former cathedral in New Zealand
- Old St Paul's Anglican Church, Deniliquin, a former church in New South Wales, Australia
