= St. Paul's Chapel (disambiguation) =

St. Paul's Chapel usually refers to a church in New York City built in the 18th century.

St. Paul's Chapel or Chapel of St Paul may also refer to:

- Chapel of Saint Paul, Damascus, Syria
- St. Paul's Chapel (Columbia University), United States, built in the early 20th century
- St. Paul's Chapel (Crownsville, Maryland), United States, listed on the National Register of Historic Places
- St. Paul's Chapel (Staatsburg, New York), United States, Roman Catholic parish church
- Sourp Boghos chapel, Nicosia, Cyprus, Armenian Apostolic chapel

== See also ==
- St. Paul's Church (disambiguation)
