= Basilica of St Paul =

Basilica of St Paul may refer to:

- Basilica of Saint Paul Outside the Walls, Rome
- Basilica of St. Paul (Daytona Beach, Florida)
- Basilica of St Paul, Rabat, Malta
- St. Paul's Basilica, Toronto, Canada

== See also ==
- St. Paul's Church (disambiguation)
- St. Paul's Cathedral (disambiguation)
- Basilica of Saints Peter and Paul (disambiguation)
