= St. Paul's Cathedral (disambiguation) =

St Paul's Cathedral is a cathedral in London, England.

St. Paul's Cathedral or the Cathedral of Saint Paul or the Cathedral Church of Saint Paul, or other variations of the name, may also refer to:

== Albania ==
- St. Paul's Cathedral, Tirana

== Australia ==
- St Paul's Cathedral, Bendigo
- St Paul's Cathedral, Melbourne
- St Paul's Cathedral, Rockhampton
- St Paul's Cathedral, Sale

== Belgium ==
- St. Paul's Cathedral, Liège

== Canada ==
- St. Paul's Cathedral (London, Ontario)
- St. Paul's Cathedral (Regina, Saskatchewan)
- St. Paul's Cathedral (Saskatoon, Saskatchewan)

== Chile ==
- St. Paul's Cathedral (Valparaíso)

== China ==
- St. Paul's Cathedral, Wenzhou

== Côte d'Ivoire ==
- St. Paul's Cathedral, Abidjan

== Germany ==
- St.-Paulus-Dom, Münster

== India ==
- St. Paul's Cathedral, Kolkata
  - St. Paul's Cathedral Mission College

== Kenya ==
- St Paul's Cathedral, Nairobi attached to the Nairobi University
- St Paul's Cathedral, Embu, a unique African-inspired design and is among the largest in Africa

== Macau (People's Republic of China) ==
- Cathedral of Saint Paul in Macau

== Malta ==
- St Paul's Cathedral, Mdina
- St Paul's Pro-Cathedral, Valletta

== Mozambique ==
- St. Paul's Cathedral, Pemba

== New Zealand ==
- Saint Paul's Cathedral, Wellington
- St. Paul's Cathedral, Dunedin

== Portugal ==
- St Paul's Cathedral, Lisbon

== Saint Helena (United Kingdom) ==
- Saint Paul's Cathedral (Saint Helena)

== South Korea ==
- St. Paul's Cathedral, Incheon

== Syria ==
- Syriac Catholic Cathedral of Saint Paul

== Uganda ==
- St Paul's Cathedral on Namirembe Hill, Kampala

== United Kingdom ==
- St Paul's Cathedral, London, England
  - Old St Paul's Cathedral, its Gothic predecessor
- St Paul's Cathedral, Dundee, Scotland

== United States ==
- Cathedral of Saint Paul (Birmingham, Alabama), listed on the NRHP in Alabama
- St. Paul's Cathedral (San Diego), California
- St. Paul's Episcopal Cathedral (Peoria, Illinois)
- Cathedral Church of St. Paul (Springfield, Illinois)
- Cathedral Church of Saint Paul (Des Moines, Iowa), listed on the NRHP in Iowa
- Cathedral Church of St. Paul, Boston, Massachusetts, listed on the NRHP in Massachusetts
- Cathedral of Saint Paul (Worcester, Massachusetts), listed on the NRHP in Massachusetts
- Cathedral Church of St. Paul, Detroit, Michigan, listed on the NRHP in Michigan
- Cathedral of Saint Paul (Minnesota), St. Paul, Minnesota, listed on the NRHP in Minnesota
  - First Cathedral of Saint Paul (Minnesota)
  - Second Cathedral of Saint Paul (Minnesota)
  - Third Cathedral of Saint Paul (Minnesota)
- St. Paul's Cathedral (Buffalo, New York), listed on the NRHP in New York
- Saint Paul's Episcopal Cathedral (Syracuse, New York), listed on the NRHP in New York
- St. Paul's Cathedral (Oklahoma City), listed on the NRHP in Oklahoma
- Cathedral of St. Paul (Erie, Pennsylvania)
- Cathedral of Saint Paul (Pittsburgh, Pennsylvania), listed on the NRHP in Pennsylvania
- Cathedral Church of St. Paul (Burlington, Vermont)
- St. Paul Cathedral (Yakima, Washington)
- St. Paul's Cathedral (Fond du Lac, Wisconsin)

== Other uses ==
- St. Paul's Cathedral (painting), a 1754 painting by Canaletto

== See also ==
- St. Paul's Church (disambiguation)
- Basilica of St Paul (disambiguation)
