= St. Paul's Parish Church =

St. Paul's Parish Church may refer to:

- St. Paul's Parish Church (Batesville, Arkansas), listed on the NRHP in Arkansas
- St. Paul's Parish Church (Brandywine, Maryland), listed on the NRHP in Maryland
- St. Paul's Parish Church (Malden, Massachusetts), listed on the NRHP in Massachusetts
