= St. Paul's United Methodist Church =

St. Paul's United Methodist Church can refer to:

- St. Paul's United Methodist Church (Nyack, New York), listed on the U.S. National Register of Historic Places
- St. Paul's United Methodist Church (Houston, Texas)
- St. Paul's United Methodist Church (South Bend, Indiana), built by the Studebaker family
- St. Paul's United Methodist Church (Toledo, Ohio), formerly listed on the National Register of historic Places in Lucas County, Ohio

== See also ==
- St. Paul's Methodist Church (disambiguation)
