= St. Paul's Parish Church (Malden, Massachusetts) =

Historic church in Massachusetts, United States

- U.S. National Register of Historic Places
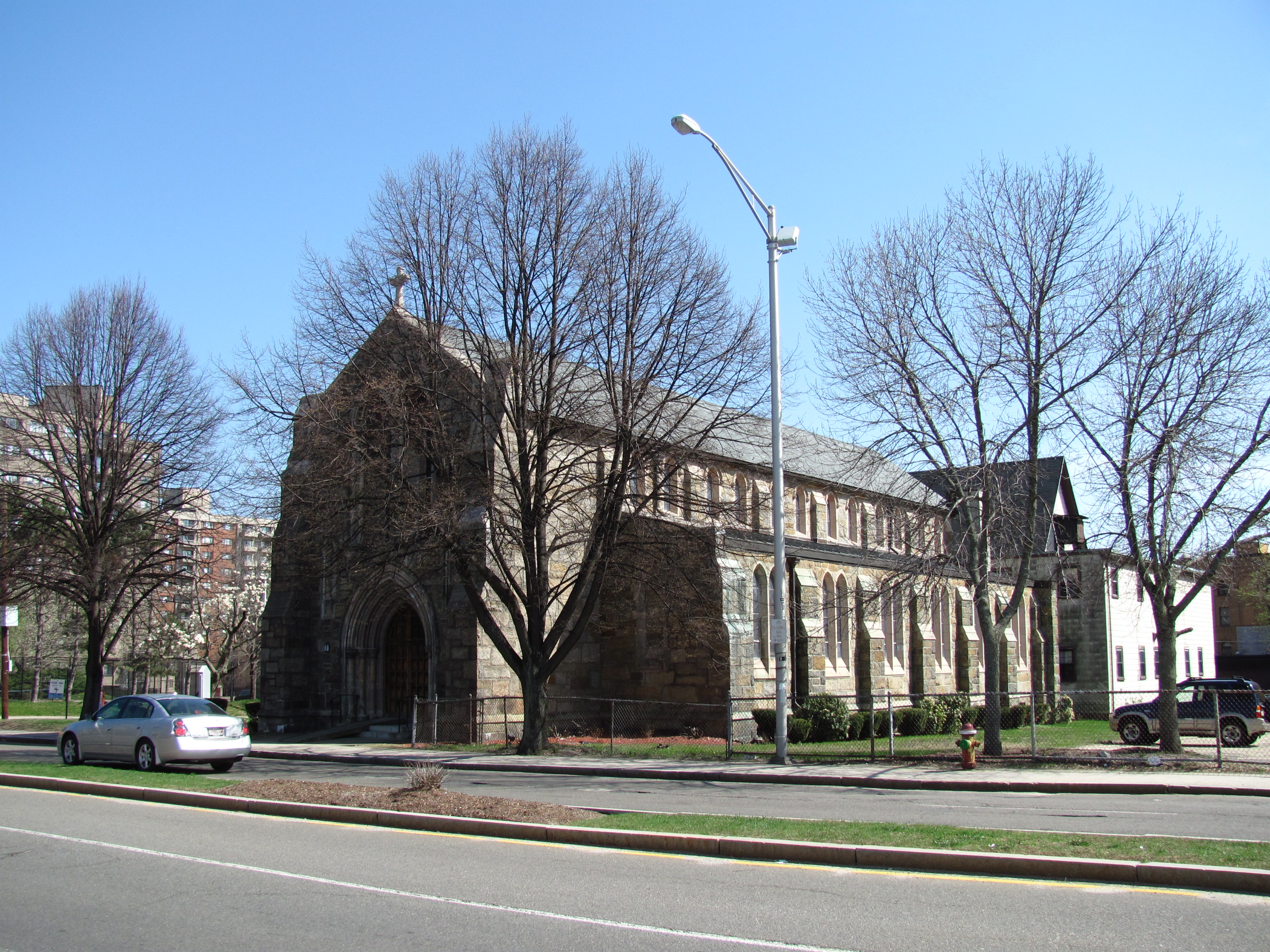
- St. Paul's Parish Church

- Location within Massachusetts Location within the United States
- Location: Malden, Massachusetts
- Coordinates: 42°25′54″N 71°4′37″W
- Built: 1913
- Architect: Ralph Adams Cram; et al.
- Architectural style: Gothic Revival
- NRHP reference No.: 01001199
- Added to NRHP: September 28, 2001

St. Paul's Parish Church is a historic, Gothic Revival Episcopal church designed by architect Ralph Adams Cram. It is located at 26 Washington Street in Malden, Massachusetts and was built in 1913. The current building replaced an earlier 1871 building that now serves as the church's parish house. Some of the church's stained glass windows were created by the noted glass studio of Wilbur Herbert Burnham. The church was listed on the National Register of Historic Places in 2001. Its current minister is the Rev. Stephen Voysey.

== Description and history ==
St. Paul's Parish Church is located at the southwest corner of Washington and Florence Streets, west of downtown Malden's Main Street business district, and south of a residential area. It is a two-story rectangular structure, built out of ashlar granite stone in the Gothic Revival style. Its main entrance faces north toward Florence Street, recessed in a Gothic-arch opening, above which are a pair of tall Gothic windows. Smaller Gothic windows are elevated on either side of the entrance, with buttresses at the outer edge of the facade. The church is six bays deep, with buttresses separating paired Gothic windows.

The building was designed by the noted proponent of the Gothic Revival, Ralph Adams Cram, and was completed in 1913. Its stained glass windows were provided by Wilbur Herbert Burnham, a frequent Cram collaborator. The congregation for which it was built was founded in 1861 and formally organized in 1867. It first met in a number of area halls, and its first church was built on an adjacent lot in 1872. Growth in the congregation prompted the need for a larger edifice, resulting in construction of the present building. The old church building now serves as the parish house.

== See also ==
- National Register of Historic Places listings in Middlesex County, Massachusetts
