= St. Paul's Reformed Church (Startown, North Carolina) =

Historic church in North Carolina, United States

- U.S. National Register of Historic Places
- Location within North Carolina Location within the United States
- Location: Jct. of SR 1151 and SR 1005 (3562 Startown Road), Startown, North Carolina
- Coordinates: 35°38′52″N 81°16′5″W
- Area: less than one acre
- Built: 1903
- Architectural style: Late Gothic Revival
- MPS: Catawba County MPS
- NRHP reference No.: 90000860
- Added to NRHP: June 21, 1990

St. Paul's Reformed Church is a historic church located at Startown, Catawba County, North Carolina.

== History ==
=== 1759 - 1903 ===
St. Paul's Reformed Church dates its beginning to 1759. In that year, a German Reformed congregation and a Lutheran congregation, worshipping in the same building, called their first pastor: the Rev. James Martin, a Swiss Reformed pastor. These German immigrants who made up the two congregations had arrived in this country seeking religious freedom and economic relief. The historic St. Paul's Church building was built in 1818 and is the oldest church structure west of the Catawba River.

=== 1904 - 1974 ===
This Reformed/Lutheran, union-church arrangement continued until 1904 when the Reformed congregation decided to relocate a few miles away to the Startown Community to be closer to the homes of its members. In Startown the Reformed congregation constructed a Victorian / Late Gothic Revival-style, one room church building. At this point in its history, St. Paul's was part of a four-church charge.

In 1937 The Reformed Church joined with the Evangelical Synod to form the Evangelical and Reformed Church. The Startown congregation was then referred to as St. Paul's E&R Church.

=== 1975–present ===
In 1974, the congregation relocated again, one-half mile from the 1904 church, and built a new facility. The two-church arrangement continued with Bethel Church until 1978 when the St. Paul's congregation began supporting a full-time pastor on its own.

The congregation is nondenominational.

Two of the former buildings used by St. Paul's still stand today: the one constructed in the early 1800s (Old Conover-Startown Road, Newton) and the Victorian-style structure (Startown Road and Dove Street, Newton). Both of these older buildings are registered historic landmarks.

The St. Paul's Reformed Church at Startown was listed on the National Register of Historic Places in 1990.

== Gallery ==
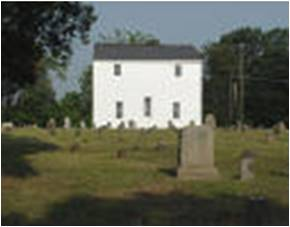
St. Paul's Church (1818)

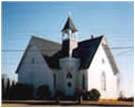
St. Paul's Reformed Church (1904)

St. Paul's Church (1975)
