= St. Paul's Methodist Church (Oyster Bay, New York) =

Coordinates: 40°52′10.03″N 73°31′52.16″W

St. Paul's Methodist Church was a small Methodist congregation that built their first church building on Orchard Street, Oyster Bay, New York in 1858. In 1895, Joseph B. Wright bought the building from them and continued his business there for many years. The congregation then moved to a new building on South Street which they had been working on since 1891. By 1913 the congregation had expanded. To create more room the building was raised, a basement excavated, and several rooms including a kitchen were built. In the 1920s, a forty-foot bell tower that had been damaged by lightning had to be demolished. North Shore Church bought the structure in 1999, and services are being held there today.

== History ==
As was the case with many other congregations, the first group of Methodists in Oyster Bay did not have a church of their own. Instead, traveling Methodist ministers from Jamaica, Long Island, visited here as early as 1812 and used space at the Oyster Bay Academy for services. Finally, in 1858 they were able to build a small church on Orchard Street where Oyster Bay Manor now sits. In 1895 Joseph B. Wright, a blacksmith, bought the building from them and continued his business there for many years. St. Paul's Methodist Church was ready to move into this church building, which they had been working on since 1891.

In 1904 a new pipe organ was installed; half of which was paid for by the wealthy philanthropist Andrew Carnegie. By 1913 the congregation had grown substantially, and to create more room the entire building was raised using a series of jacks. A basement was excavated and several rooms including a kitchen were built.

Though the church has retained much of its charm, other changes have occurred over the years. A forty-foot spire which used to extend above the bell tower was struck by lightning in the 1920s and had to be removed. The "Carnegie" organ no longer exists and the interior has been given a more modern appearance. In 1988 St. Paul's Methodist Church merged with another congregation in East Norwich and the Bethel Pentecostal Church moved here Bethel outgrew this building and moved to Westbury, and in 1999 the North Shore Church, part of the Presbyterian Church of America, made this their new home.

Just like the early Methodists in the 1990s North Shore Church began as a small congregation with no church building. Today their Oyster Bay ministry has grown and flourished and includes the large parsonage next door.

The more modern look of the interior suits them and their contemporary Christian music program, which features elements of Jazz. After Sunday services have ended, the El Shaddai Pentecostal Church, another local congregation, holds their service in North Shore's chapel.

== See also ==
- Oyster Bay History Walk
- List of Town of Oyster Bay Landmarks
- National Register of Historic Places listings in Nassau County, New York
