= St. Paul the Apostle Church =

St. Paul the Apostle Church may refer to:

in Canada

- St. Paul the Apostle Church (Toronto)

in the United States

(by state, then city)

- St. Paul the Apostle Church and School in Los Angeles, California
- St. Paul the Apostle Church (Calumet, Michigan), listed as a Michigan State Historic Site
- St. Paul the Apostle Church (Manhattan), listed on the National Register of Historic Places
- St. Paul the Apostle Church (Mechanicville, New York)
