= St. Paul's Cathedral, Pemba =

St. Paul's Cathedral
- Catedral de São Paulo
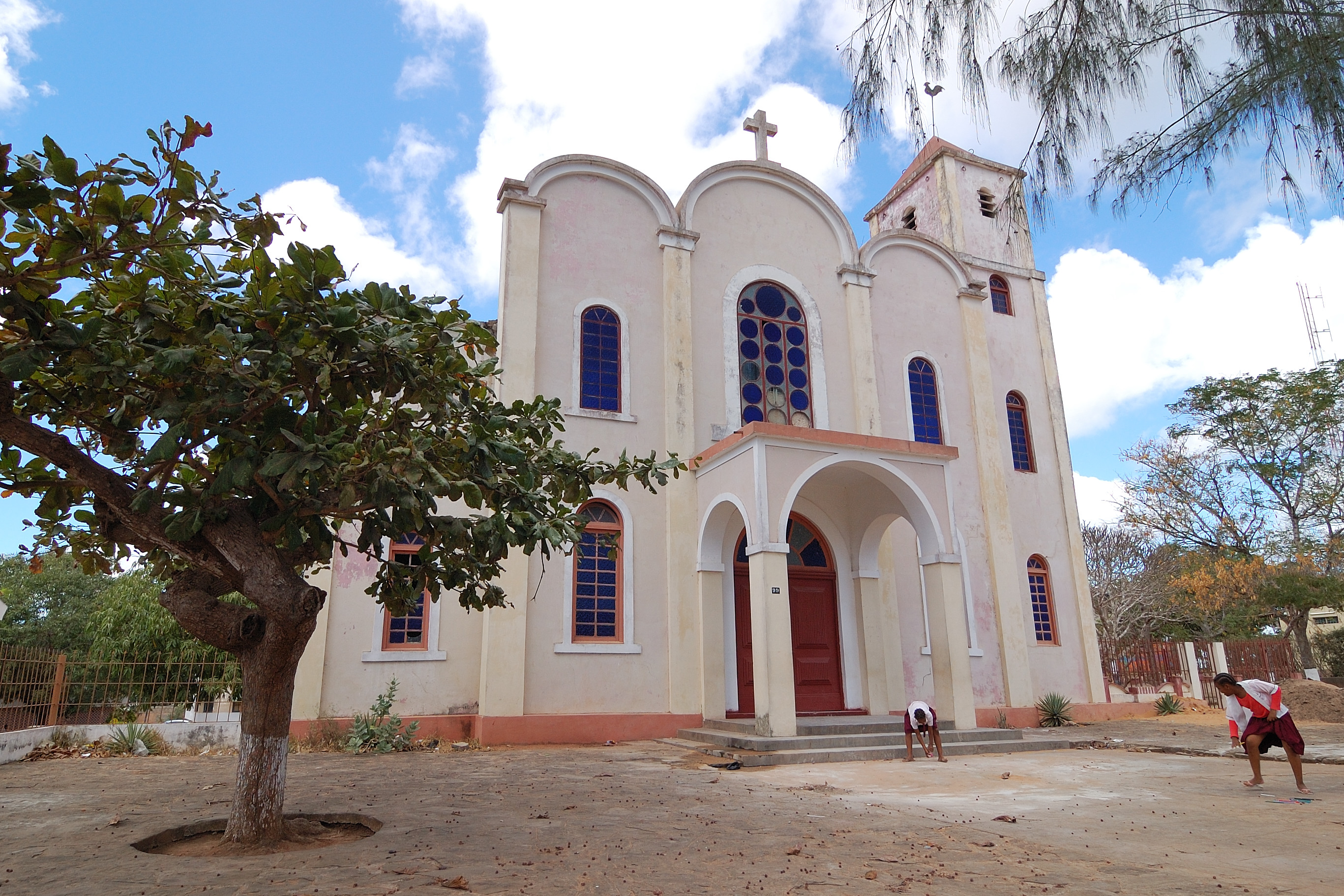
- St. Paul's Cathedral
- 12.9663°S 40.4972°E
- Location: Pemba
- Country: Mozambique
- Denomination: Roman Catholic Church

The St. Paul's Cathedral (Portuguese: Catedral de São Paulo ) also called Pemba Cathedral Is the name that receives a religious building affiliated to the Catholic Church that is in the city of Pemba in the African country of Mozambique. It is dedicated to St. Paul, one of the apostles of Jesus.

The church was established in 1946 as a parish church by the Monfortinos brothers. The congregation follows the Roman or Latin rite and is the mother church of the Diocese of Pemba (Dioecesis Pembanus) that was created as Diocese of Porto Amelia in 1957 through the bull "Quandoquidem" of Pope Pius XII when the country was still a dependent territory of Portugal.

It is under the pastoral responsibility of Bishop Luiz Fernando Lisboa.

== See also ==
- Roman Catholicism in Mozambique
- Maputo Cathedral
