= St. Paul's Episcopal Church (Greenville, Texas) =

Episcopal church in Greenville, Texas, US

Coordinates: 33.086696°N 96.080786°W

St. Paul's Episcopal Church is an Episcopal church, located in Greenville, Texas, United States.

The church was designated a mission church in 1877, and the sanctuary located at 3215 Stonewall Street was opened on July 16, 1896. In 1966, the site received the Texas Historic Landmark which noted that it was the oldest church building still in use in Greenville. On February 16, 1969, a fire destroyed the historic structure and the building was razed. Land was purchased at 8320 Jack Finney Blvd. (FM 1570), and on July 22, 1973 ground was broken for a new church building, and the new church was consecrated on September 17, 1974. The parish hall and other facilities were added over the years. The historical marker for the original building is located in the parish hall. In 1984, the St. Paul's Episcopal School constructed its current facility on church land.

== See also ==
- Anglican Communion
- Episcopal Church in the United States of America
- Episcopal Diocese of Dallas
