= St. Paul's Methodist Protestant Church (Culbertson, Nebraska) =

Historic church in Nebraska, United States

- U.S. National Register of Historic Places
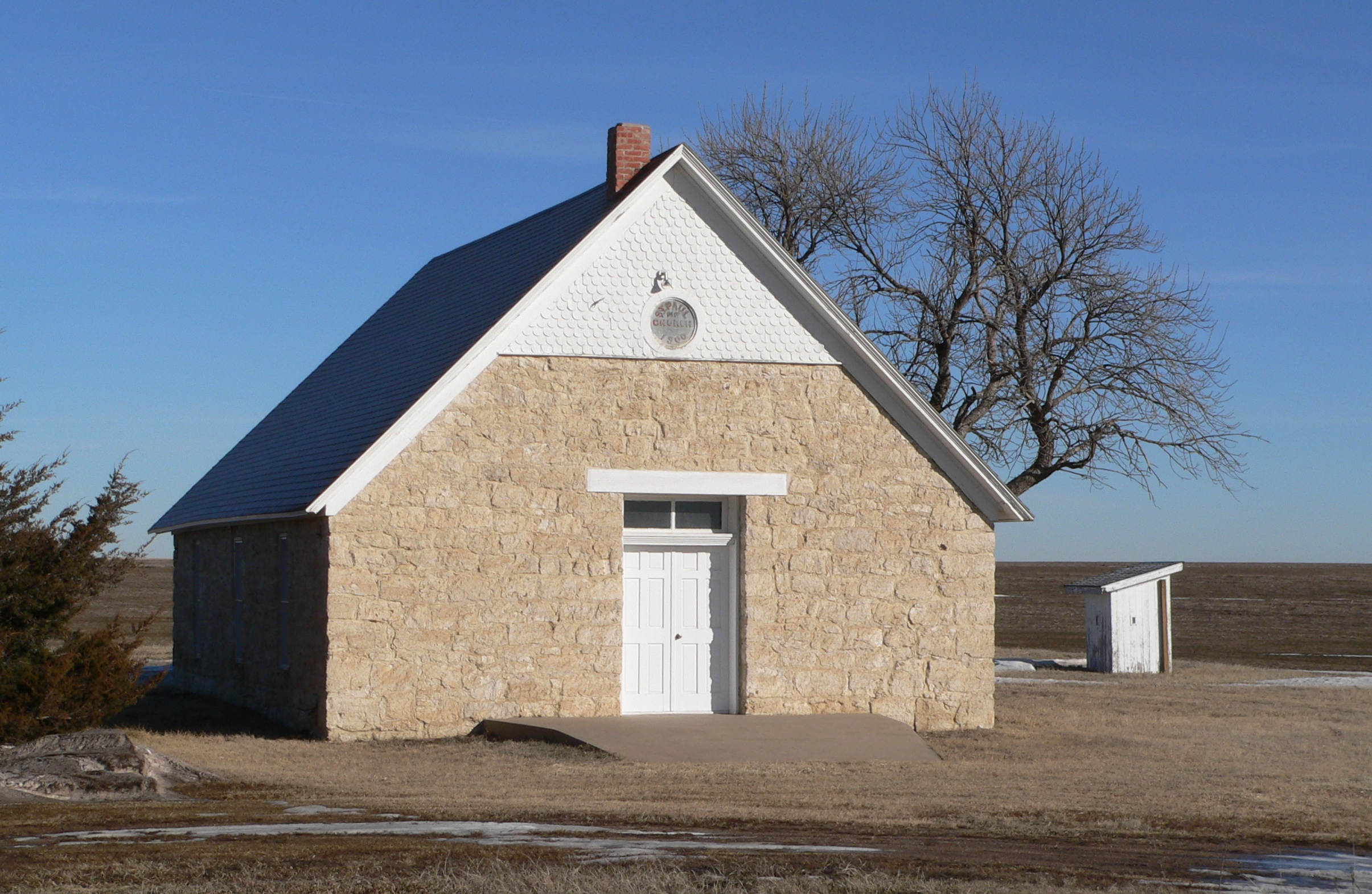

- Location within Nebraska Location within the United States
- Nearest city: Culbertson, Nebraska
- Coordinates: 40°6′52″N 100°48′55″W
- Area: 1 acre (0.40 ha)
- Built: 1900
- Built by: James L. Hoyt
- NRHP reference No.: 79001446
- Added to NRHP: January 25, 1979

St. Paul's Methodist Protestant Church, also known as Stone Church, is a church building located south of Culbertson, Nebraska, United States, on Nebraska Highway 17. It was built in 1900 and was added to the National Register in 1979.

== History ==
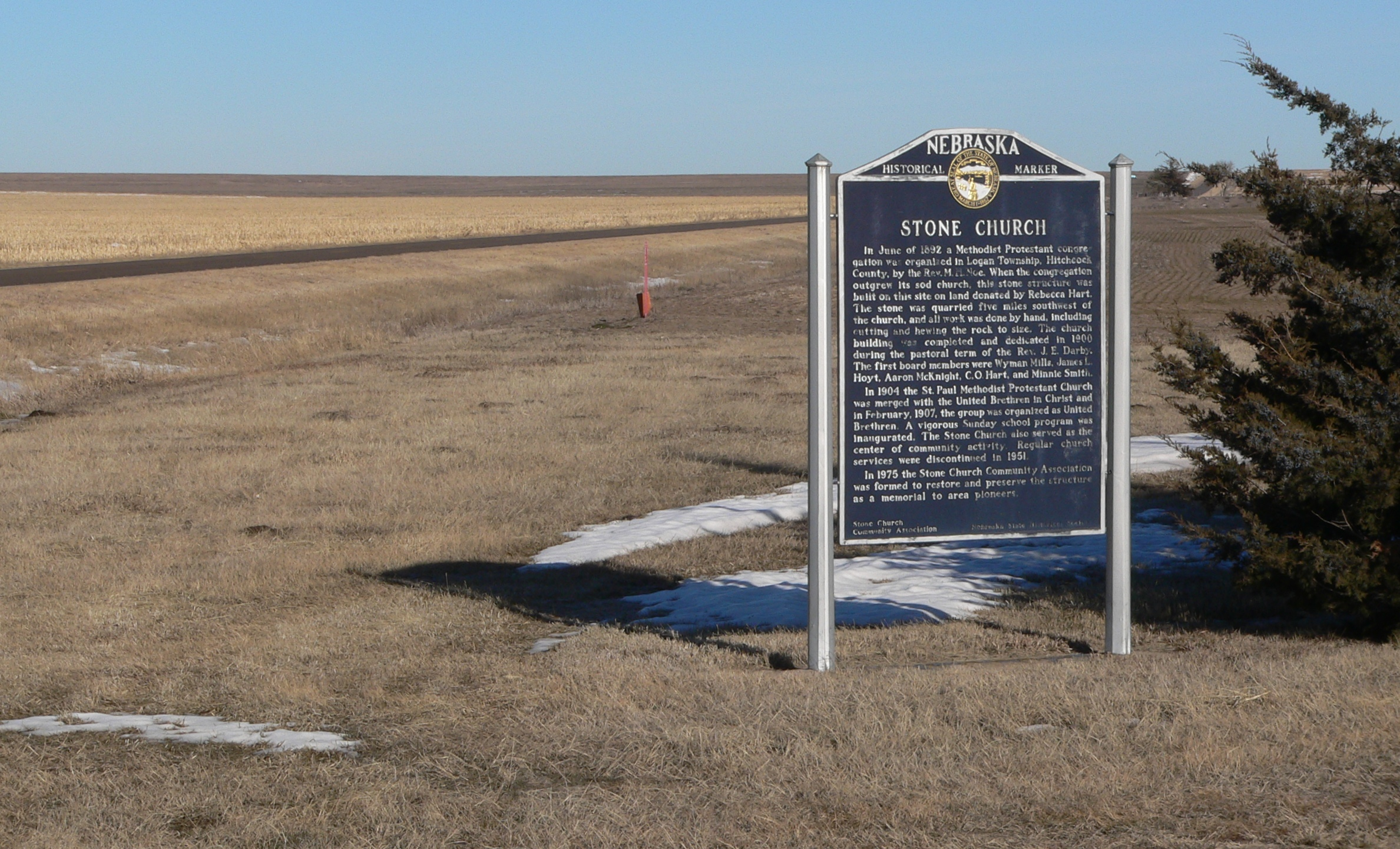
Stone Church historical marker

In 1885, a sod church was built to accommodate the growing population of the area along Driftwood Creek. Methodist minister M.H. Noe led the first worship services in the sod building the same year. The current building stands across the road from the original sod church.

=== Construction ===
Building the Stone Church which succeeded the sod church was a community endeavor, with most of the labor donated by parishioners. Limestone was quarried from a local rock formation and hauled by wagon to the construction site, roughly 5 miles (8.0 km) away. Church members cut, hewed, and loaded the limestone by hand under the supervision of Jim Flynn and local stonemason James Lewellyn Hoyt. Hoyt's sons, who at ages eight and ten were too small to load the stones, were tasked with placing dynamite charges to blast the limestone apart in the quarry. The acre of land upon which the church was built was donated by Rebecca Hart.

The church's construction is impressive considering that, at the time of its construction, the majority of its parishioners still lived in unimproved sod houses and dugouts. Construction on the church was finished in 1900 and dedicated as the St. Paul Methodist Protestant Church led by Reverend J.E. Darby.

=== Dedication to Disuse ===
Four years later, the congregation of St. Paul Methodist Protestant Church merged with the local group of United Brethren in Christ in 1904. In 1907, the church was formally reorganized as United Brethren. Regular church services continued in the building until 1951.

The Stone Church was a cornerstone of the Driftwood Community until the 1950s. The church was the home of the local Sunday school, an orchestra, and various local events. In the early twentieth century, the Stone Church was also the polling place of the community.

=== Restoration ===
At a celebration of the seventy-fifth anniversary of the church's construction, a committee was organized to restore the building. Over the course of seventy-five years, the structure had been damaged in several ways. Since the restoration process began, the roof has been replaced, the walls have been reinforced, and faulty electrical wiring has been removed. The interior of the building has been restored to a similar state to its original construction.

The Stone Church has neither plumbing nor electricity due to the era of its construction and its remote location. The building is not in regular use, but is maintained by the Stone Church Community Association as a memorial to the settlers who built it. Annual gatherings are held at the Stone Church to commemorate and celebrate the church and its construction.
