= St. Paul's Lutheran Church, Riga =

St. Paul's Lutheran Church
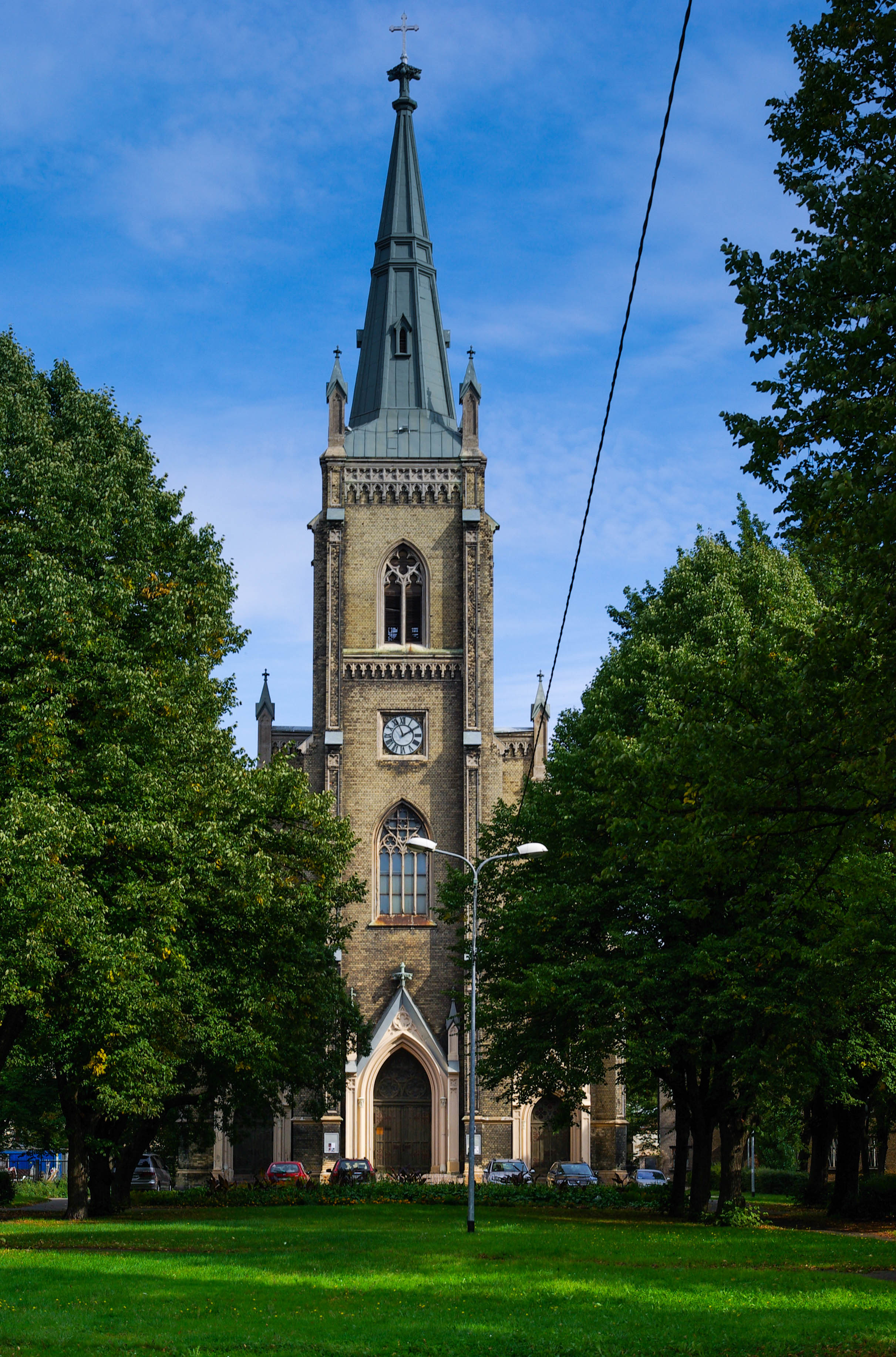

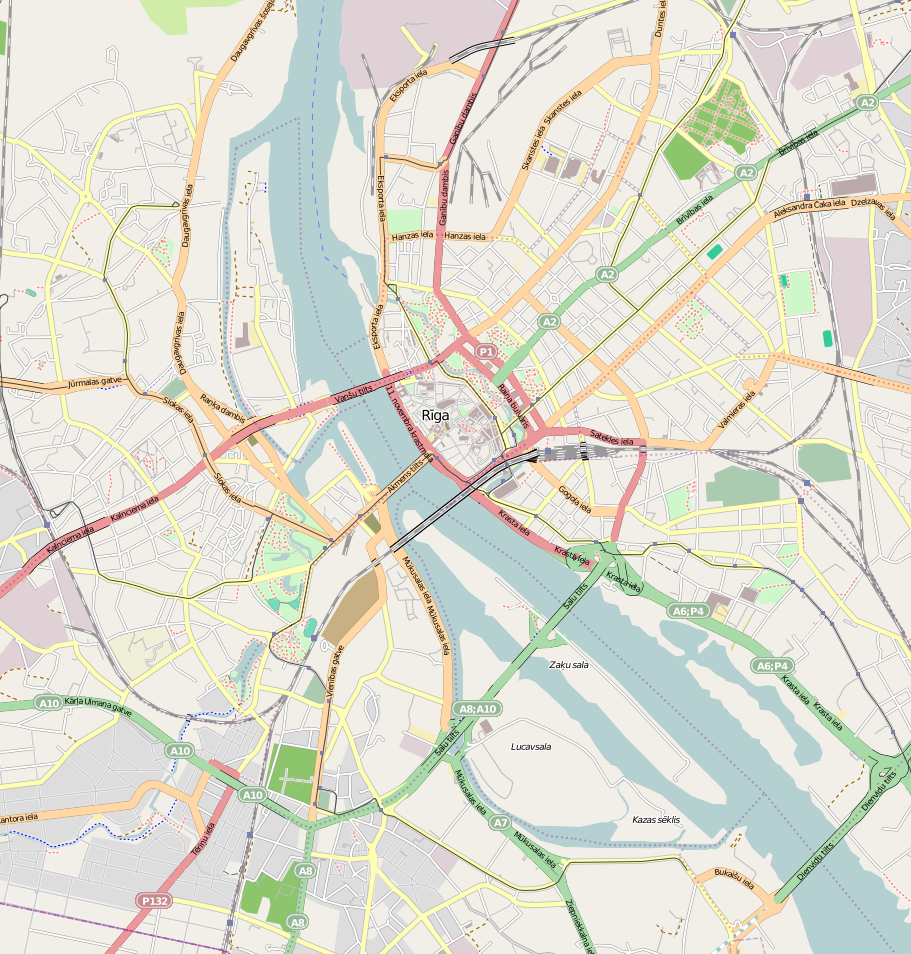
- Location within Riga
- 56°57′15.00″N 24°8′57.48″E
- Location: Riga
- Country: Latvia
- Denomination: Lutheran

St. Paul's Lutheran Church (Latvian: Svētā Pāvila evaņģēliski luteriskā baznīca) is a Lutheran church in Riga, the capital of Latvia. It is a parish church of the Evangelical Lutheran Church of Latvia. The church is situated at the address 1 Augusta Deglava Street.

Church building was consecrated in 1887. Church was designed by German architect Gustav Hilbig, however after his death in 1887 last building works was finished under supervision of his son architect Hermann Hilbig.
