= St. Paul's Lutheran Church (Oak Hill, New York) =

Historic church in New York, United States

- U.S. National Register of Historic Places
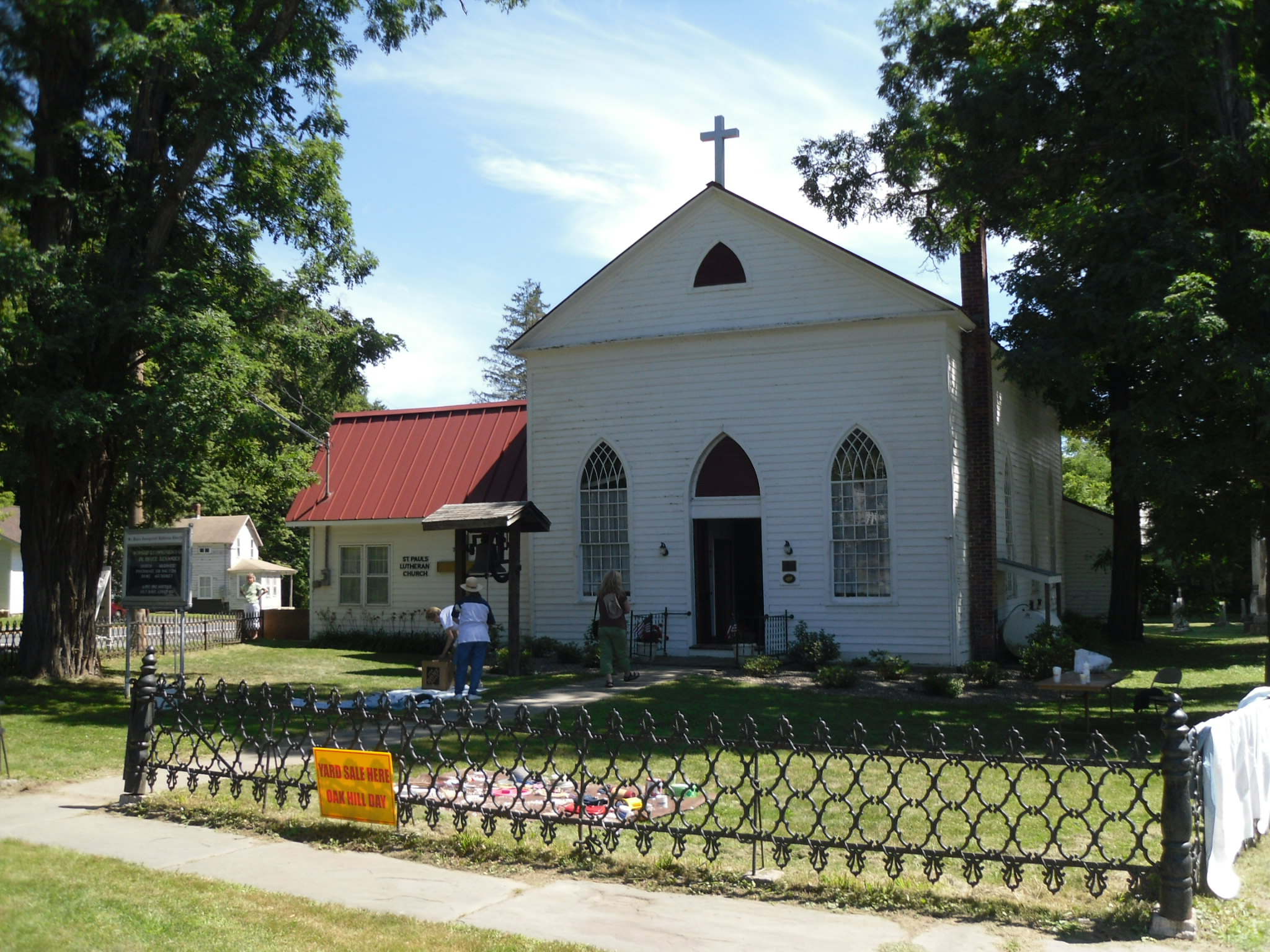
- St. Paul's Lutheran Church, July 2010

- Location within New York Location within the United States
- Location: 464 Main St., Oak Hill, New York
- Coordinates: 42°24′29″N 74°9′6″W
- Area: 4.9 acres (2.0 ha)
- Built: 1834
- Architectural style: Gothic Revival, Gothic
- NRHP reference No.: 05000682
- Added to NRHP: July 6, 2005

St. Paul's Lutheran Church, originally St. Paul's Episcopal Church, is a historic Lutheran church at 464 Main Street in Oak Hill, Greene County, New York. The original section was built in 1843 and is a heavy timber frame rectangular structure, three bays wide by four bays deep, in a conventional meeting house style. In 1883, a light frame chancel addition was completed and it features a steeply pitched gable roof.

It was added to the National Register of Historic Places in 2005.

== See also ==
- National Register of Historic Places listings in Greene County, New York
