= St. Paul's Catholic Church (San Francisco) =

Catholic church in California, US

Coordinates: 37.7442°N 122.427°W

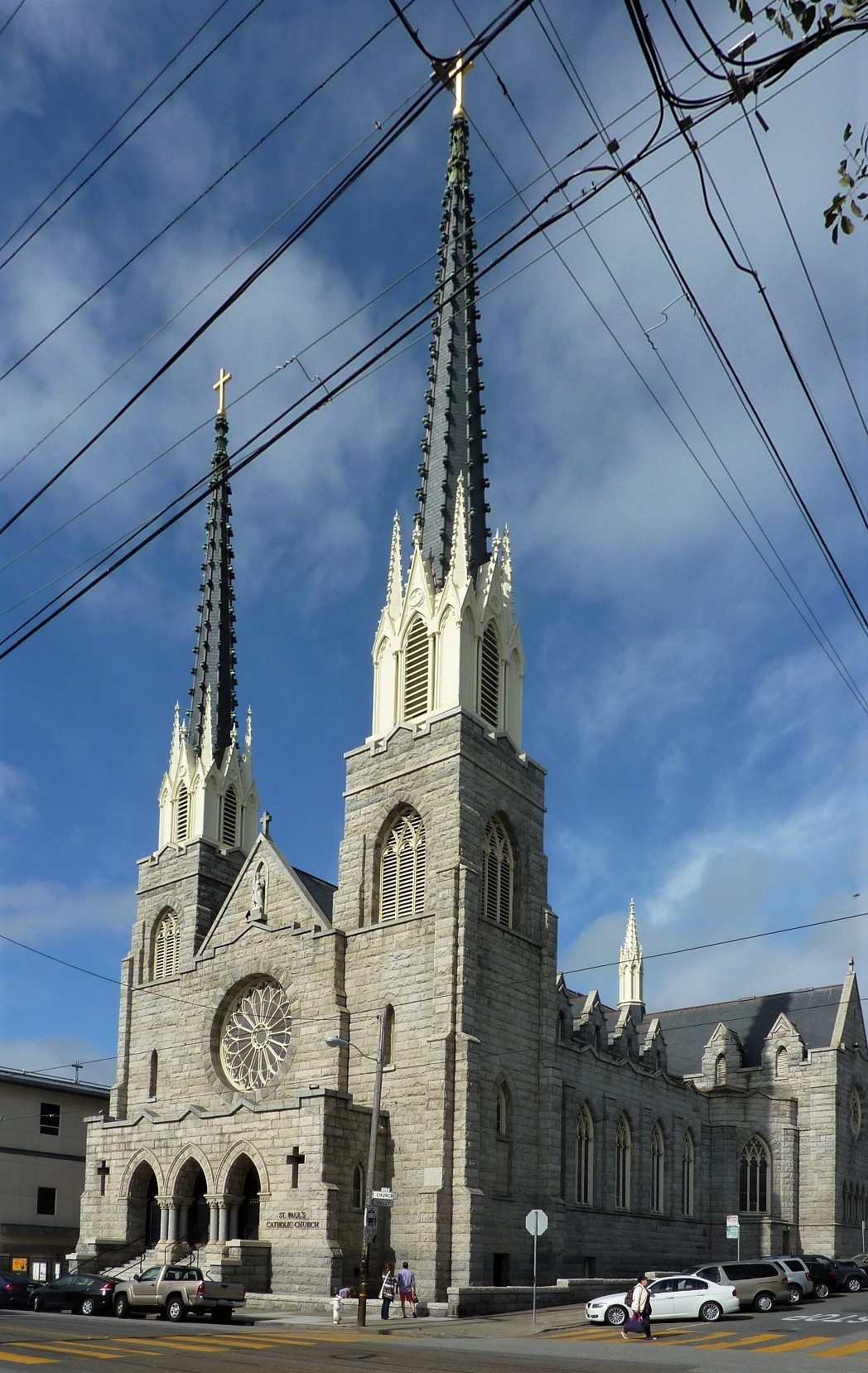
- St. Paul's Catholic Church from Church Street
- St. Paul's Catholic Church
- Location: San Francisco
- Country: United States
- Denomination: Catholic Church
- Sui iuris church: Latin Church
- Website: http://www.stpaulsf.org/

Architecture
- Style: Gothic Revival
- Groundbreaking: 1897
- Completed: 1911

Specifications
- Length: 200 ft (61 m)
- Height: 365 ft (111 m)

St. Paul's Catholic Church (Spanish: Parroquia de San Pablo) is an American Catholic parish church of the Archdiocese of San Francisco. The parish is located in the city of San Francisco, California, at 221 Valley Street and the corner of Church Street in the city's Noe Valley neighborhood.

== History ==
St. Paul's traces its history back to 1876 when George Shadbourne communicated a desire to Archbishop Joseph Alemany, OP to have a new parish established, as well as a willingness to help collect money, purchase land, and construct a parish church. Archbishop Alemany approved the request, and in 1880 a church building and a residence for the curé was built. This first church seated up to 750 people, and served approximately 200 families.

In 1897, growth led the parish to construct the current 1,400 seat English Gothic structure. Construction took 14 years because the parish used "pay-as-you-go" financing on the new structure, therefore saving the parish from incurring construction debt upon completion. The new church was dedicated on May 29, 1911 by Archbishop Patrick W. Riordan.

The church required seismic reinforcement after the 1989 Loma Prieta earthquake. At one point, the archdiocese seriously considered closing St. Paul's because of the potential costs of reinforcing the church and adjacent buildings; this decision was later reversed. The parish sold some of the adjacent buildings and reinforced the remaining buildings, which cost approximately $8.5 million.

St. Paul's has also been the location for several movie and television episodes throughout its long history. In a season 4 episode of The Streets of San Francisco entitled "Requiem for Murder" there are both interior and exterior views of the church used during the episode. In 1992, the parish was the site of filming for the comedy film Sister Act, which starred Whoopi Goldberg. While the parish – called "St. Katherine's Monastery" in the film – is actually in the upscale middle class neighborhood of Noe Valley, the surrounding area was set redressed to make it appear that the church was in a much poorer community like the Tenderloin or Bayview.
