= St. Paul's Lutheran Church (Wurtemburg, New York) =

Historic church and cemetery in Dutchess County, New York, US

- St. Paul's Lutheran Church, Parsonage and Cemetery
- U.S. National Register of Historic Places
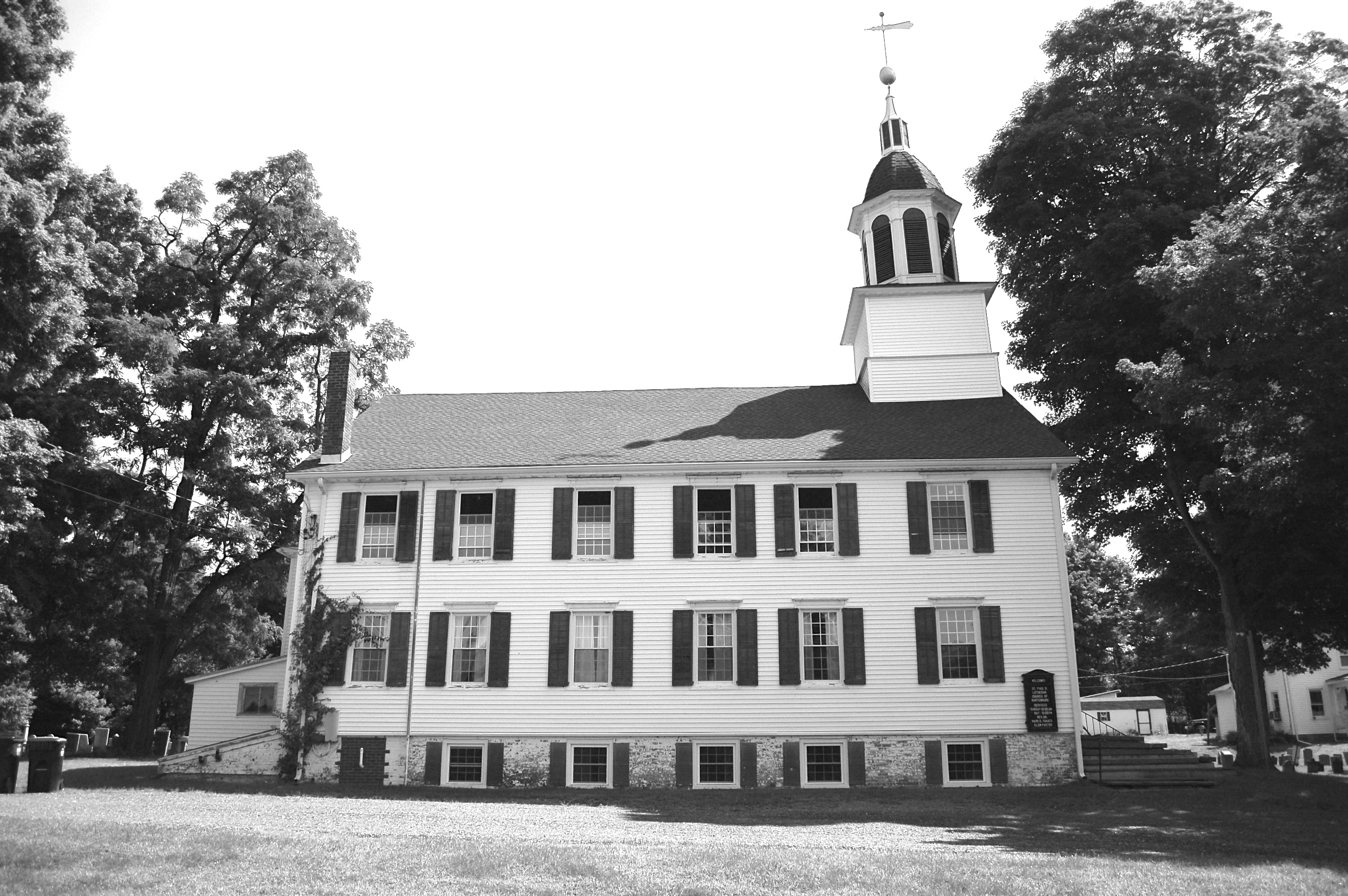

- Location within New York Location within the United States
- Nearest city: Wurtemburg, New York
- Coordinates: 41°53′54″N 73°52′02″W
- Area: 3.6 acres (1.5 ha)
- Built: c1802
- Architectural style: Federal, Vernacular Federal
- MPS: Rhinebeck Town MRA
- NRHP reference No.: 87001083
- Added to NRHP: July 9, 1987

St. Paul's Lutheran Church, Parsonage and Cemetery is a historic Lutheran church, parsonage, and cemetery in Wurtemberg in Dutchess County, New York.

The church was built about 1802, enlarged in 1832, and remodeled in 1861. It is a large, two-story rectangular frame building with a gable roof and prominent central tower. It is in the Federal style. The parsonage was built about 1870 and is a two-story, center-hall frame building in the Italianate style. The cemetery has burials dating from the 18th and 19th centuries. Also on the property are two sheds.

It was added to the National Register of Historic Places in 1987.

== Gallery ==
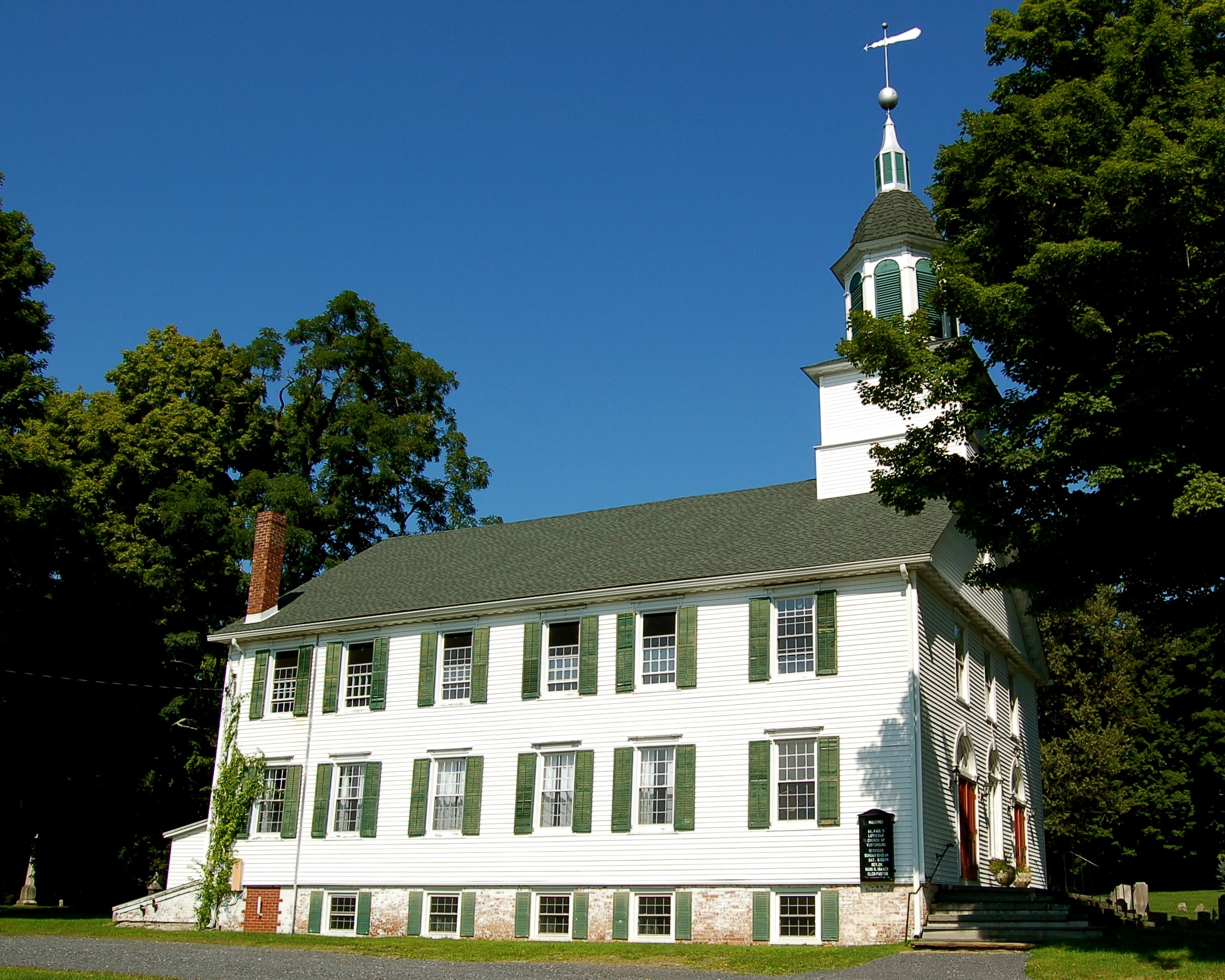
West side of Federal style Church.

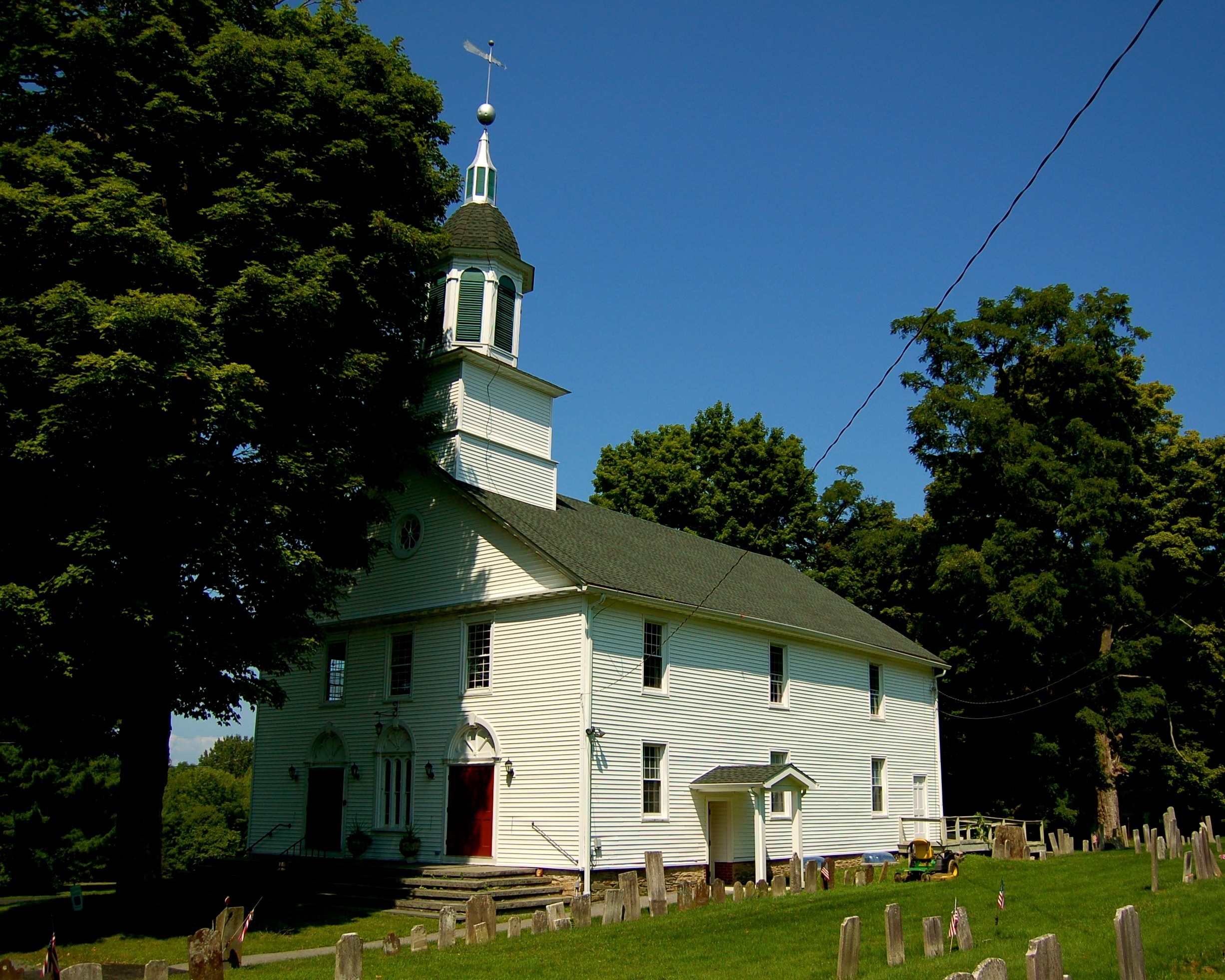
East side of Church.

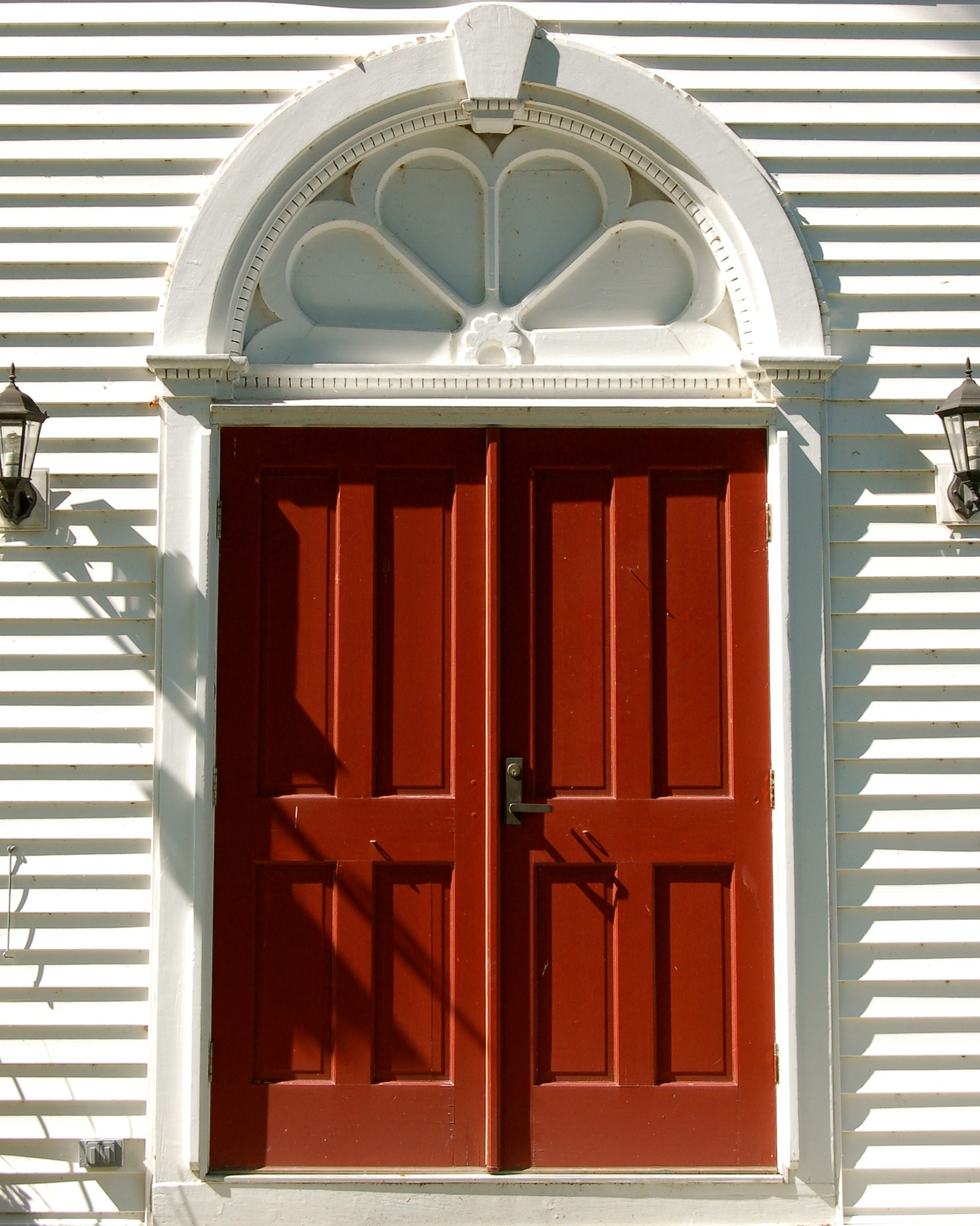
Close-up of front doorway to Church.

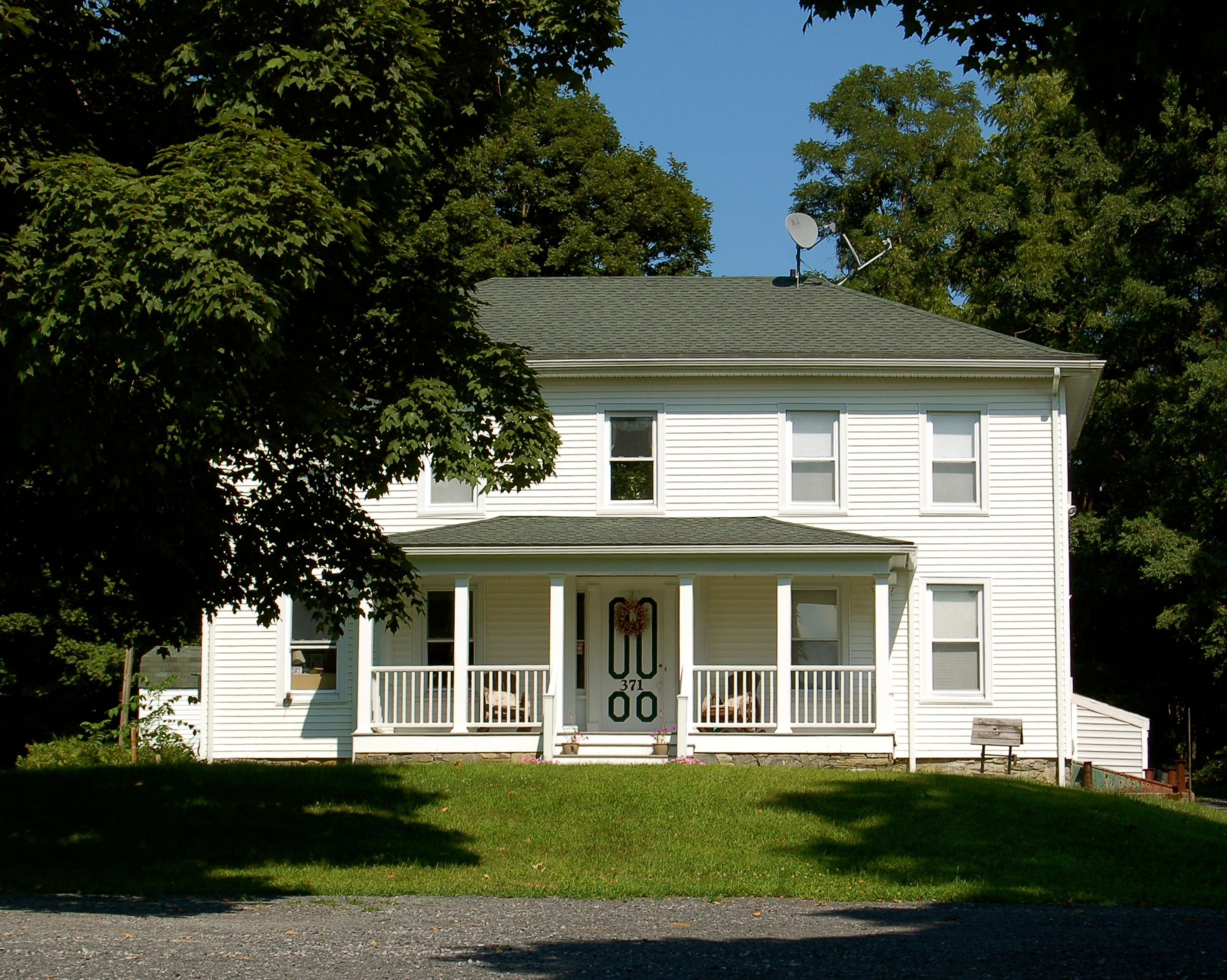
Italianate style Parsonage.

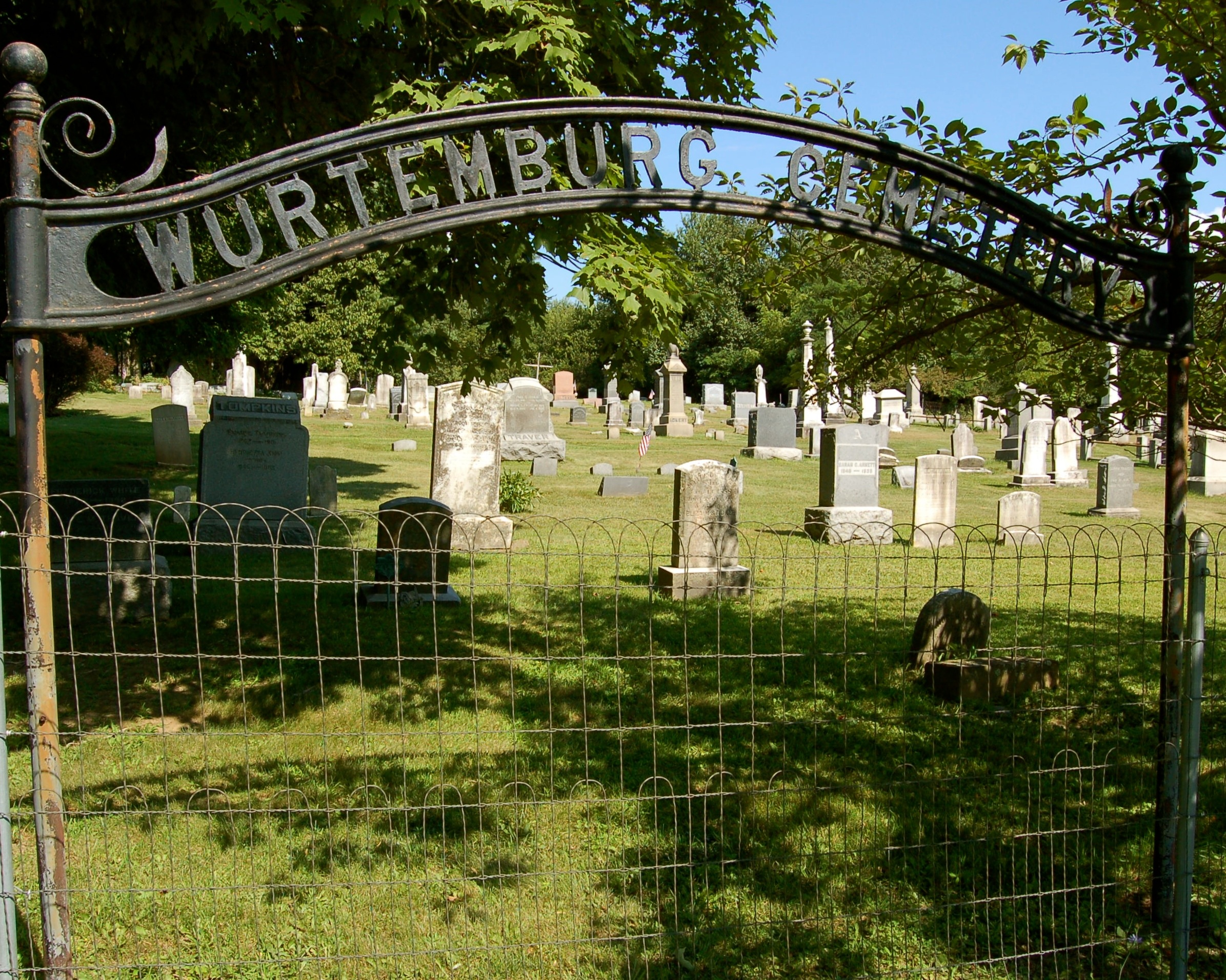
Wurtemberg Cemetery, old entrance.
