= St. Paul's (Zion's) Evangelical Lutheran Church =

Historic church in New York, United States

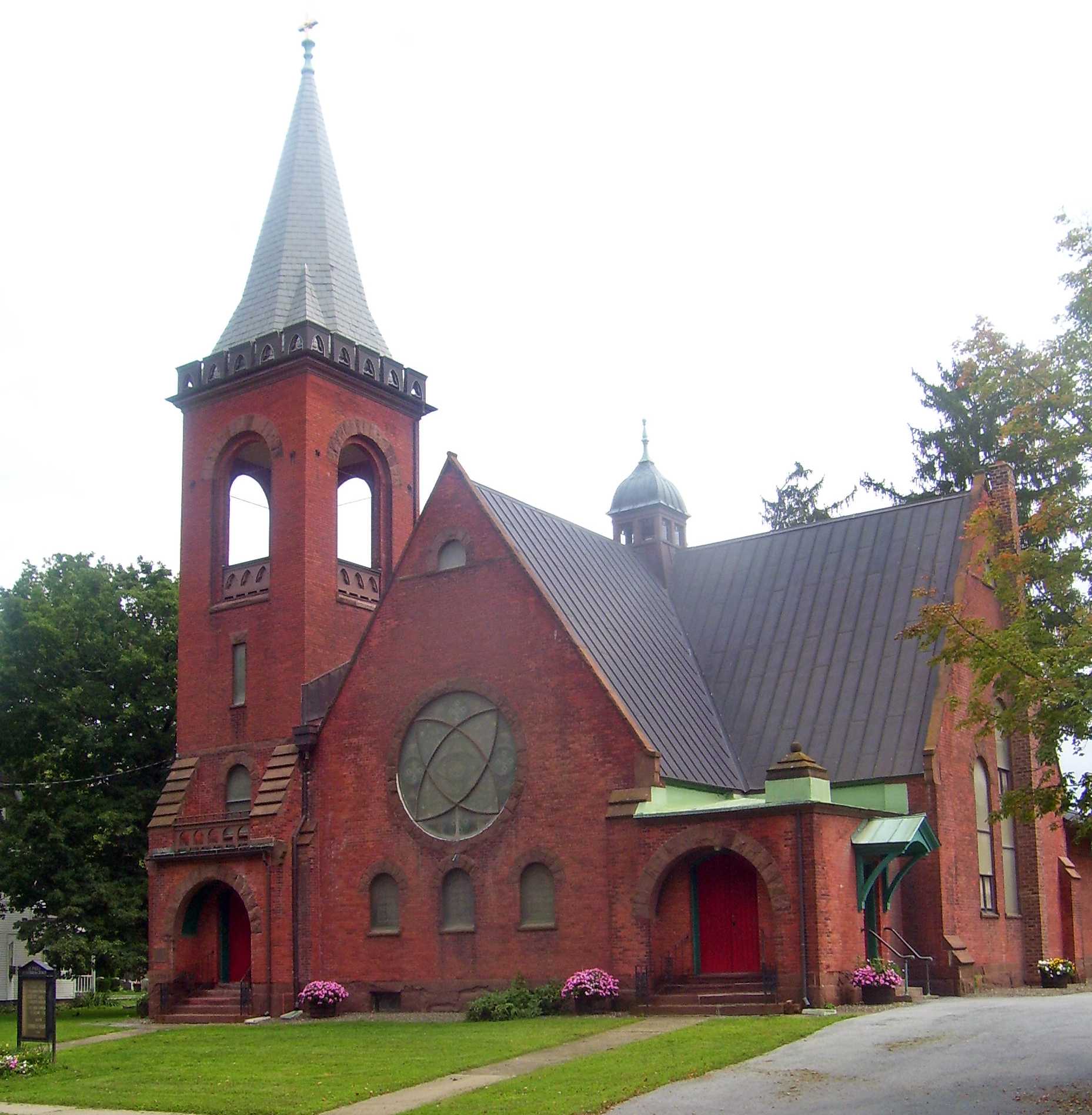
- East elevation and south profile, 2008

Religion
- Affiliation: Evangelical Lutheran Church in America
- Leadership: Rev. James Miller

Location
- Location: Red Hook, New York, United States
- Interactive map of St. Paul's (Zion's); Evangelical Lutheran Church
- Coordinates: 41°59′30″N 73°52′41″W

Architecture
- Architects: Lawrence B. Valk and Son
- Type: Church
- Style: Romanesque Revival
- General contractor: Daniel van de Bogart
- Groundbreaking: 1889
- Completed: 1890
- Construction cost: $18,650

Specifications
- Direction of façade: west
- Materials: Brick, stone, slate

U.S. National Register of Historic Places
- Added to NRHP: August 31, 1998
- NRHP Reference no.: 98001065

Website
- St. Paul's Lutheran Church

St. Paul's (Zion's) Evangelical Lutheran Church is the official name of what is usually referred to as St. Paul's Lutheran Church in Red Hook, New York, United States. Its six buildings and cemetery are on a 15-acre (6.1 ha) lot on South Broadway (US 9) just south of the village center. The current church is the third building on a spot that has been home to what was originally a Reformed congregation since 1796.

It is one of several Lutheran churches in the area that trace their roots to Palatine German emigrants in the early 18th century. Its late 19th-century brick building is a sophisticated application of the Romanesque Revival architectural style by a New York City architect. In 1998 the entire complex was listed on the National Register of Historic Places. Recently, it considered selling and demolishing some of the buildings due to financial difficulties. It joined up with two other Lutheran congregations in the area to form the Lutheran Parish of Northern Dutchess in 2009, and it continues to hold weekly services.

== Property ==
The church's property is bounded by South Broadway on the west, Fisk Street to the north, Elizabeth Street in the east and a residence on the south. It is a complex of six buildings, four of which are in a row along the street with the 10 acre (4 ha), and two with the cemetery in the rear. All are considered contributing resources to its historic character. In addition to the main entrances on Broadway there is an entry from Fisk Lane. The land is open with some mature trees.

=== Church ===
The church itself is located third from north. It is an asymmetrical brick building with cross-gabled roof topped by a cupola. Windows and doors are in rounded arches. The western (front) facade has a large, detailed rose window with quatrefoil tracery. Below it are three small stained glass windows with sandstone voussoirs. Another small window is above the rose window, in the tympanum.

The main entrance is at a small one-story flat-roofed stone porch, with its archivolts likewise in sandstone. A similar porch and secondary entrance are on the northwest corner, at the base of the bell tower. It rises to a broached top with round-arched openings on all four sides and a rounded copper-roofed stair turret. Below the east gable is a steep, conical roof over the cellar entrance near the sanctuary.

Inside, the church has plaster walls, wainscoting and deeply recessed windows and doors. Sail vaults support the ceiling, supported by corbels and smaller vaults rising from the columns. With the corrugated metal ceiling, the overall effect suggests a tambour.

The floor is laid out following the late 19th-century Akron Plan. Pews are arranged in a semicircle on a sloping floor throughout the transept and nave. Baptismal and choral daises are in the southern corners and the altar is under a raised semidome.

=== Other buildings ===
Just north of the church is the parsonage, a Queen Anne-style two-and-a-half-story house with high-pitched roof and wraparound porch. To its north is the parish hall, a Victorian Gothic frame house, whose steeply pitched roof is complemented by a bracketed cornice and pointed-arch windows.

On the south end of the row of church buildings is the cemetery caretaker's home, the oldest building on the property. It is a five-bay, one-and-a-half-story frame saltbox house. To the rear of the front row are a small wooden barn, with cross-gabled metal roof and sliding front doors, currently used as a garage. The cemetery office nearby is a one-story frame building with gabled roof and garage doors.

=== Cemetery ===
The cemetery takes up the rear of the lot. It is mostly flat, with some undulation near the east side. Several paved and unpaved lanes cross it to provide vehicular access to graves, dividing it into 20 sections, their routes corresponding to former lot boundaries.

The earliest gravestone is dated 1813. It is one of a few marble and sandstone markers from that era. Victorian-era marble and granite headstones predominate in five other sections, with the remainder being from the 20th century. There is one zinc marker, and a few vaults. None of the individual gravestones are remarkable for their funerary art or the person buried.

== History ==
Lutheranism came to northwestern Dutchess County in the 1710s, with Palatine German refugees from the War of Spanish Succession. After an attempt to cultivate naval stores on the lands of Robert Livingston in today's Columbia County, they were released. Some settled in the Rhinebeck and Red Hook areas at the invitation of another large local landholder, Henry Beekman. The Germans established a joint Reformed-Lutheran Church in the Red Hook community in 1715.

In 1729 the Lutherans left, either due to a dispute with their Calvinist countrymen or because their congregation had grown enough to require its own church. They established what is today known as the Old Stone Church on the Albany Post Road (today's Route 9) between the two communities. The Reformed-Lutheran Church then became known as the Zion German Reformed Church.

That church bought a five-acre (2 ha) plot in Red Hook at the current location in 1796 and moved in six years later. At that time the building now used as the caretaker's cottage was the only improvement, having been constructed a few years before. The congregation built a frame church that was completed the next year. Whether the cemetery was established prior to its earliest known burial, in 1813, is not known.

The frame church blew down during a storm in 1834 and a new church was built of stone. A new church in a figurative sense came along in 1846, when the congregation was unable to find a pastor. To resolve the problem, they became Lutherans and became known as St. Paul's.

In the 1880s the complex began to expand with the construction of the parish hall on the north end of the property. Two years later, the congregation's growth led to a fundraising drive for another new church. The stone church was demolished in 1889, as worshippers began digging a new cellar. The current church was built for $18,650 ($668,000 in contemporary dollars) and opened the following year.

It was designed by New York City architect Lawrence B. Valk, who had written extensively about church design in an 1873 book, Church Architecture. He said that "churches are for the salvation of souls, not for architectural display at the sacrifice of comfort". Most of his other churches are closer to the city, in New York, Ossining or Long Island. His church in rural Red Hook is not any different from his urban churches of the period. It is most similar to the Congregational Church of Patchogue, where he also used the very contemporary Romanesque Revival style and a similar plan.

The early 20th century brought the parsonage to the property, in 1903. Three years later the church building was outfitted with electric light, and carpeting and a new pipe organ came in subsequent years. In 1914 the congregation petitioned a New York court for a name change to the current corporate name, reflecting the church's origins as the Zion German Reformed Church.

The cemetery grew enough that in the 1920s the office and barn were acquired, the last contributing resources on the property. It became necessary to acquire more land, and several adjoining parcels were bought until the church's land reached its present size in 1939. There have been a few alterations since then. Work on the cellar in 1956 led to the removal of an original porte cochère and the addition of an endwall chimney on the south side. The original slate roof was replaced in the 1970s.

By the early 21st century the church was struggling financially, and found that by April 2009 it would be broke. In 2008 it proposed to the village that it demolish the caretaker's cottage and parish hall in order to resubdivide the property and create five new buildable lots. The proceeds from doing so would help keep the cemetery and church functioning. Local preservationists objected, saying that the caretaker's cottage was "organic to the site" and should be moved, not demolished.
