= Old St Paul's Church, Hoddlesden =

Church in Lancashire, England

Coordinates: 53.7002°N 2.4341°W

Old St Paul's Church is a former Anglican parish church in the village of Hoddlesden, Lancashire, England. The foundation stone was laid on 27 July 1861, and the church was consecrated in June 1863. It was designed by the Lancaster architect E. G. Paley, and cost about £4,000 (equivalent to £470,000 in 2023). The church was constructed in local stone, and roofed with slates from Over Darwen. Its plan consisted of a nave, north aisle, chancel, and a west tower with a stair turret rising higher than the tower. The architectural style was Geometric. The nave measured 72 feet (22 m) by 25 feet (8 m), and the aisle was 20 feet (6 m) wide. The church provided seating for 650 people. It was demolished in 1975 because of damage caused by dry rot. A new church was built, also dedicated to St Paul, on a different site adjacent to the village school.

== See also ==
- List of ecclesiastical works by E. G. Paley
