= St. Paul Catholic Church (Center, Missouri) =

Historic church in Missouri, United States

- U.S. National Register of Historic Places
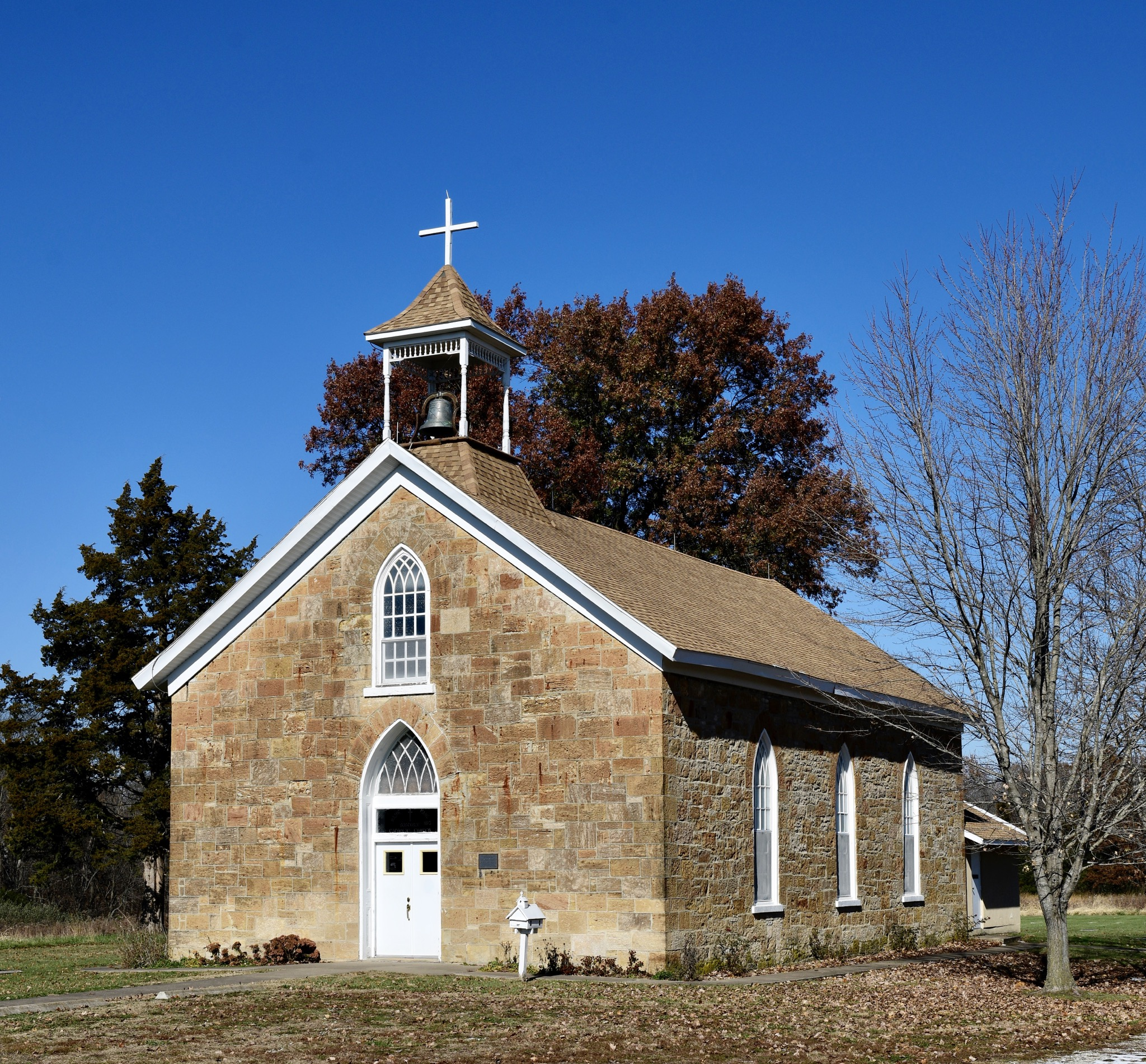

- Location within Missouri Location within the United States
- Location: West of Center off Route EE, near Center, Missouri
- Coordinates: 39°30′12″N 91°36′21″W
- Area: 15.6 acres (6.3 ha)
- Built: 1860
- Built by: Kielty, Father Francis
- Architectural style: Gothic Revival
- NRHP reference No.: 79001392
- Added to NRHP: May 31, 1979

St. Paul Catholic Church, also known as St. Paul on Salt River and Center Parish, is a historic Roman Catholic church located near Center, Ralls County, Missouri. The church was built in 1860, and is a one-story, rectangular limestone building on a stone foundation. It measures 33 feet, 6 inches, by 58 feet, 8 inches and is topped by a gable roof with cupola. It features lancet windows in the Gothic Revival style.

It was listed on the National Register of Historic Places in 1979.
