= St. Paul's Catholic Church (Portsmouth, Virginia) =

Historic church in Virginia, United States

- U.S. National Register of Historic Places
- U.S. Historic district – Contributing property
- Virginia Landmarks Register
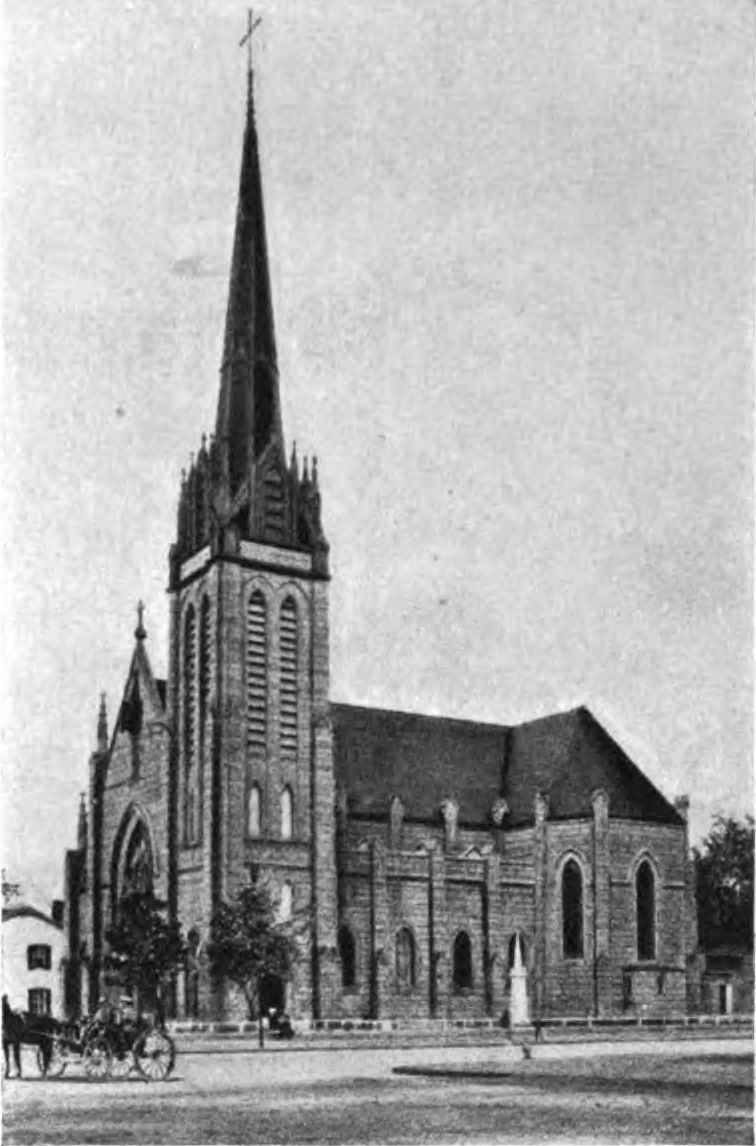
- An historic photograph of the church

- Location within Virginia Location within the United States
- Location: 518 High St., Portsmouth, Virginia
- Coordinates: 36°50′15″N 76°18′13″W
- Area: 0.8 acres (0.32 ha)
- Built: 1897-1905, 1913
- Architect: Peebles, John K.; Carpenter, John R.
- Architectural style: Gothic
- NRHP reference No.: 02000619
- VLR No.: 124-5063-0008

Significant dates
- Added to NRHP: June 6, 2002
- Designated VLR: March 13, 2002

St. Paul's Catholic Church is a historic Roman Catholic church located in Portsmouth, Virginia, United States. It is a compact Gothic Revival style, cruciform plan church. It is constructed of load-bearing masonry walls clad in quarry-faced granite. The church was designed by John Peebles (1876-1934) in 1897, and dedicated in 1905. It is the fifth church on the site. Also on the property is a contributing rectory constructed in 1913.

It was listed on the National Register of Historic Places in 2002. It is located in the Downtown Portsmouth Historic District.

Yearly, the choir director and organ player, Nick Nespoli, who is also the chorus instructor of Western Branch High School, has his students from school perform at the church around Christmas. This concert is a free event, and the music performed ranges from secular to religious music. The main pieces performed are selections from the Messiah, by Handel, or the Gloria RV 589 by Vivaldi.
