= St. Paul's Chapel (Crownsville, Maryland) =

Historic church in Maryland, United States

- St. Paul's Anglican Church
- U.S. National Register of Historic Places
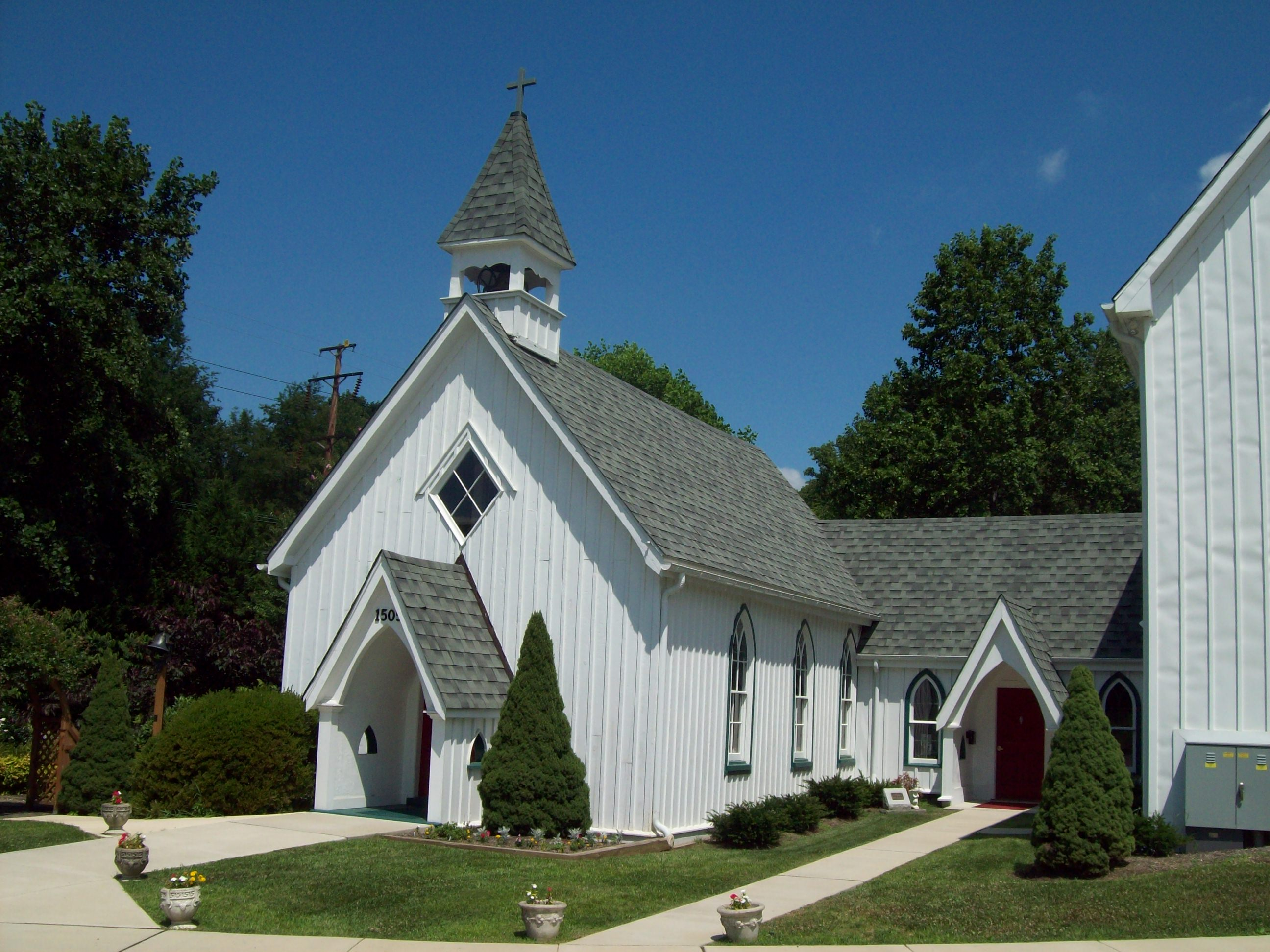
- St. Paul's Anglican Church, July 2009

- Location within Maryland Location within the United States
- Location: General's High Way and Crownsville Rd, Crownsville, Maryland
- Coordinates: 39°1′32″N 76°36′1″W
- Built: Chapel built in 1864 Main church built in 2008
- NRHP reference No.: 73000893
- Added to NRHP: March 20, 1973

St. Paul's Chapel is an historic Carpenter Gothic style Episcopal church at Crownsville, Anne Arundel County, Maryland. It is a small board-and-batten frame church composed of a simple rectangular nave, a small entrance porch, a small deep chancel, and two very small utility sections added to the sides of the chancel. There is a small cemetery on the property dating from the 1860s. It may be an example of a church built by following plans of Richard Upjohn, the noted 19th-century American architect.

St. Paul's Chapel is now part of St. Paul's Anglican Church in the Anglican Province of America. Its current rector is Rev. Wesley Walker. The Right Rev. Robert Samuel Loiselle, Sr., who is also assistant bishop of the Anglican Province of America is the rector emeritus. In 2008, a new larger church building, designed to be compatible architecturally with the chapel was built next to it and the two were joined together. Regular services using the 1928 Book of Common Prayer are held in the chapel and the main church at 8:00 am (chapel), 9:30, and 11:00 am every Sunday. Holy Communion is celebrated every day. Everyone is always welcome.

It was listed on the National Register of Historic Places in 1973.
