= Old St Paul's Anglican Church, Deniliquin =

Old St Paul's Anglican Church
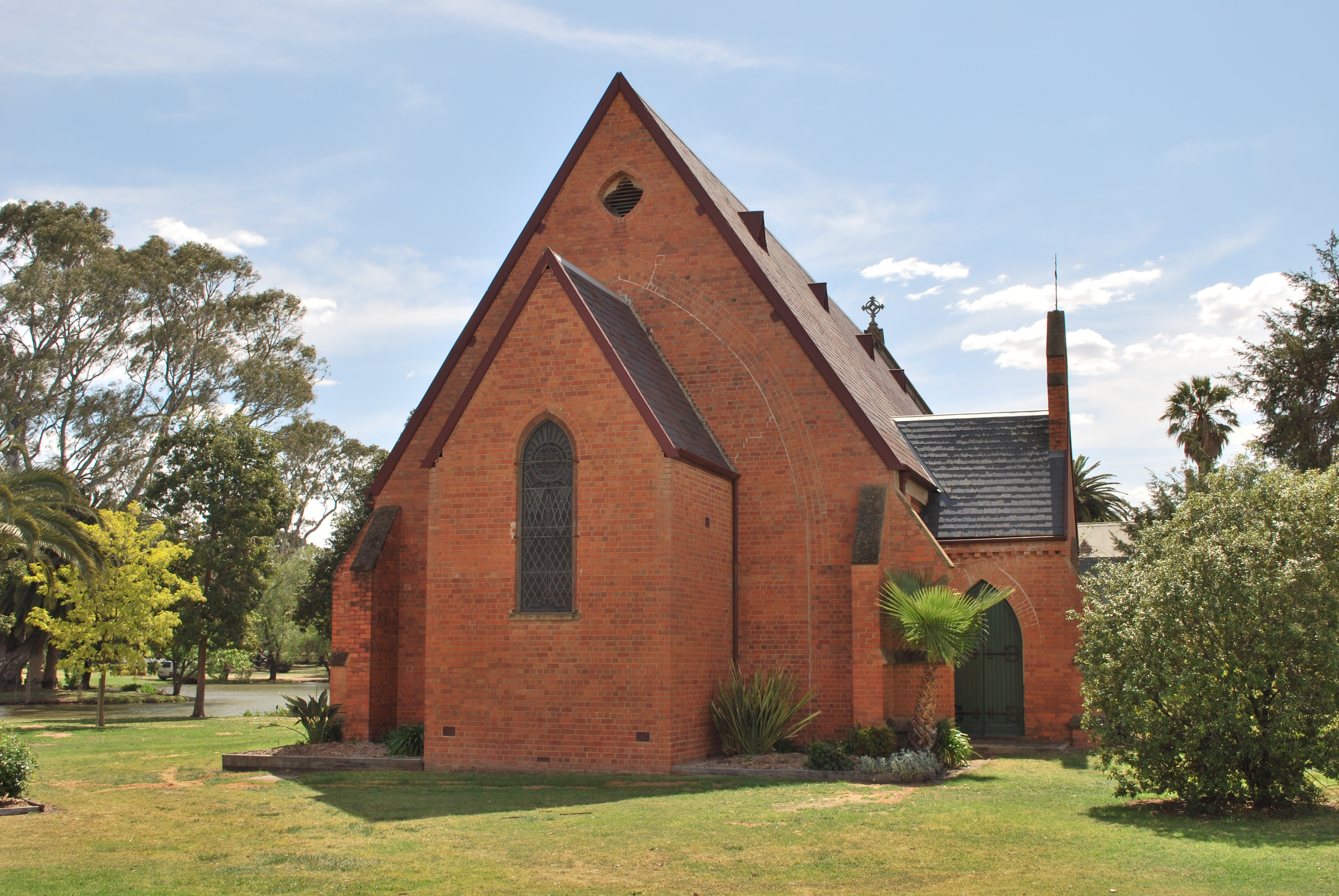
- Old St Paul's Anglican Church, pictured in 2008
- Old St Paul's Anglican Church
- 35°31′48″S 144°57′46″E
- Location: Cressy Street (South), Deniliquin, Edward River Council, New South Wales
- Country: Australia
- Previous denomination: Anglican

History
- Status: Church (1866–1977); Multi-Arts Centre (since 1990s)
- Consecrated: 1873; 153 years ago by Rev. Mesac Thomas

Architecture
- Functional status: Inactive; repurposed as an arts centre and community hall
- Architect(s): Smith & Watson
- Architectural type: Church
- Completed: 1866; 160 years ago
- Closed: 1977; 49 years ago (as a church)

New South Wales Heritage Register
- Official name: St. Pauls Anglican Church & Hall (former); St Pauls Anglican Church & Hall
- Type: State heritage (built)
- Designated: 2 April 1999
- Reference no.: 62
- Type: Church (former)
- Category: Religion
- Builders: John Taylor

Old St Paul's Anglican Church is a heritage-listed former Anglican church at Cressy Street (South), Deniliquin, Edward River Council, New South Wales, Australia. The property is owned by the Edward River Council. It was added to the New South Wales State Heritage Register on 2 April 1999.

== History ==
Subscriptions were collected from town and district Anglicans about 1857 to build a house for a minister, and eventually a church. Christ Church was built on the corner of George and Macauley Streets. Several services were held in the church before it was consecrated. On 22 October 1861, a week after the consecration, it was destroyed in a storm. The next church service was held in the Masonic Hall.

The foundation stone of St Paul's was laid in 1866. The church was designed by Melbourne architects Smith & Watson and built in 1866 by John Taylor. It was opened by the local rector Rev. Samuel Harper in November 1866, but was not formally consecrated by the Bishop of Goulburn until May 1873. The church was used until 1977 when a new church was opened on the site of the old Anglican Rectory at the junction of Poictiers, Wellington and Harrison Streets.

The church was used until 1977, when a new church was built on the site of the old Anglican rectory. It underwent major restoration in the early 1990s due to the impact of general decay and vandalism.

The Victorian Academic Gothic style church and sunday school buildings underwent extensive conservation work in the early 1990s under the auspices of Heritage Council of New South Wales. Vandals had contributed to the overall decay which had taken over the buildings. The slate roof of the church has been replaced, brickwork reinstated, doors and stained glass windows restored or replaced. The interior has also undergone major refurbishment.

It is now operated by the Edward River Council as the Multi-Arts Centre, an arts centre and community hall.

== Heritage listing ==
St Paul's Anglican Church was listed on the New South Wales State Heritage Register on 2 April 1999.

== See also ==
- List of former churches in Australia
