= St. Paul's Church and Cemetery (Paris Hill, New York) =

Historic church in New York, United States

- U.S. National Register of Historic Places
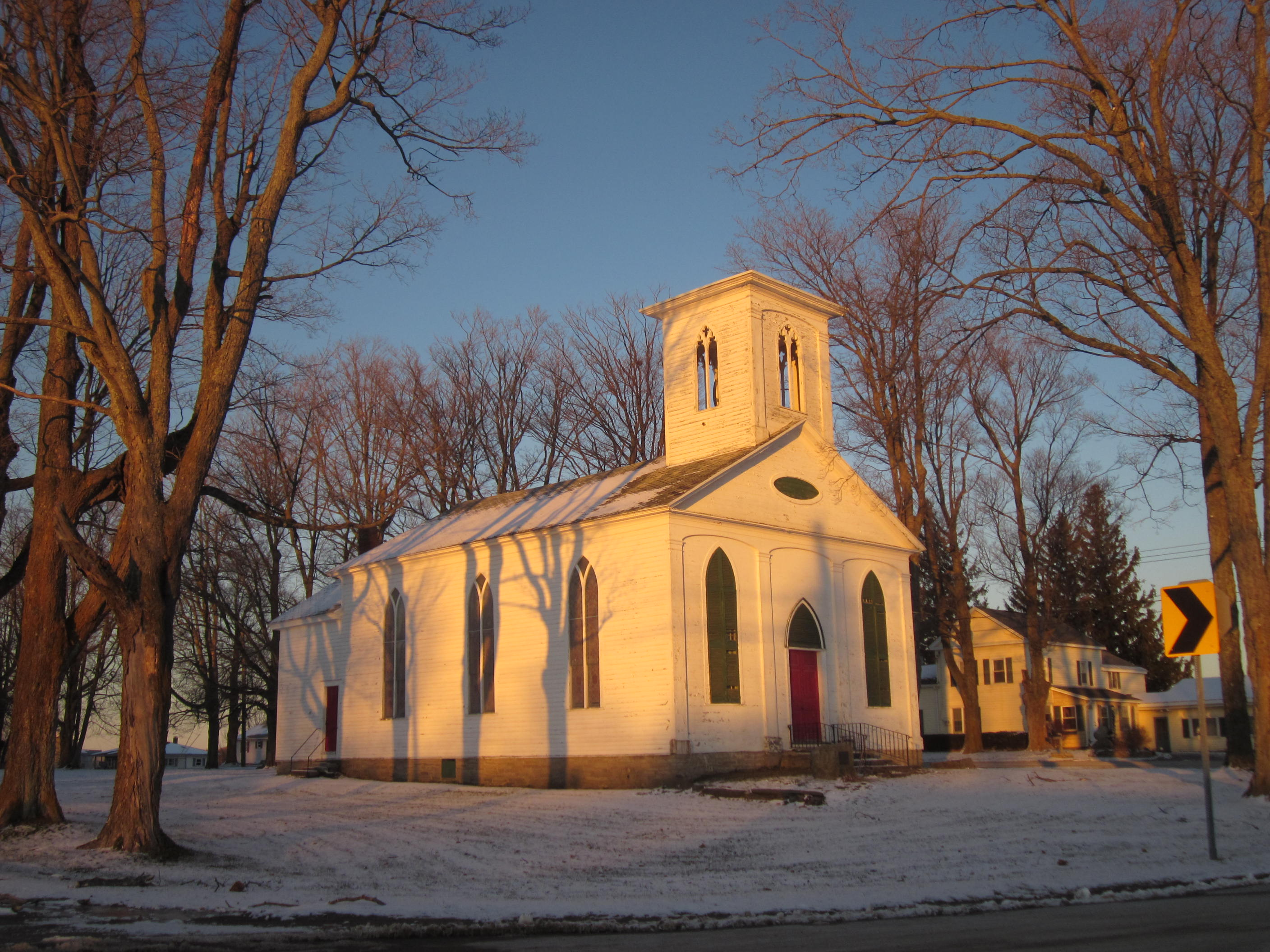
- St. Paul's Church, December 2011

- Location within New York Location within the United States
- Location: Rt. 12, jct. with Snowden Hill Rd., Paris Hill, New York
- Coordinates: 43°0′4″N 75°18′53″W
- Area: 2.5 acres (1.0 ha)
- Built: 1818
- Architectural style: Federal
- MPS: Historic Churches of the Episcopal Diocese of Central New York MPS
- NRHP reference No.: 96000961
- Added to NRHP: August 30, 1996

St. Paul's Church and Cemetery is a historic Episcopal church in Paris Hill, Oneida County, New York. It was built in 1818 and is a rectangular timber framed Federal style structure measuring 36 feet by 50 feet. It features a one-stage belfry rising from the roof. Located adjacent is the parish cemetery with burials dating from the early 19th century to the present day.

It was listed on the National Register of Historic Places in 1996.
