= St. Paul's Church and Cemetery (Newton, North Carolina) =

Historic church in North Carolina, United States

- U.S. National Register of Historic Places
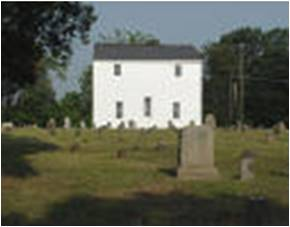

- Location within North Carolina Location within the United States
- Location: Junction of SR 1149 and SR 1164, near Newton, North Carolina
- Coordinates: 35°40′35″N 81°14′38″W
- Area: 6 acres (2.4 ha)
- Built: 1818
- Architect: Cline, Henry
- Architectural style: Federal style
- MPS: Catawba County MPS
- NRHP reference No.: 71000573
- Added to NRHP: December 09, 1971

St. Paul's Church and Cemetery also known as Old St. Paul's Lutheran Church or St. Paul's Lutheran Church is a church in Newton, North Carolina. It was listed on the National Register of Historic Places in 1971 as a Historic Place in Catawba County, North Carolina.

St. Paul's Church, Newton is a two-story log weatherboarded church built in 1818. It features a Federal style interior with carved sounding board and moldings and a separate, now repurposed, slave balcony. The building is one of the oldest existing churches in North Carolina west of the Catawba River. The graveyard headstones date to the late 18th century. The St. Paul's Reformed Church at Startown formed from this congregation in 1904.
