= List of political parties in Togo =

This article lists political parties in Togo. Togo is a one party dominant state with the Union for the Republic in power. Opposition parties are allowed, but are widely considered to have no real chance of gaining power.

== Active parties ==
=== Parties represented in the National Assembly ===
Party	Abbr.	Leader	Political position	Ideology	MPs
Union for the Republic; Union pour la république	UNIR	Faure Gnassingbé	Right-wing	Conservatism; Togolese nationalism; National conservatism; Authoritarianism	108 / 113
Alliance of Democrats for Integral Development; Alliance des Démocrates pour le Développement Intégral	ADDI	Tchaboure Gogue	Centre-left	Social democracy	2 / 113
National Alliance for Change; Alliance Nationale pour le Changement	ANC	Jean-Pierre Fabre	Centre-left	Social democracy; Progressivism; Anti-authoritarianism	1 / 113
Dynamic for the Majority of the People; Dynamique pour la majorité du peuple	DMP				1 / 113
Democratic Forces for the Republic; Forces démocratiques pour la République	FDR				1 / 113

=== Other parties ===
- Action Committee for Renewal (Comité d'Action pour la Renouveau)
- Believers' Movement for Equality and Peace (Mouvement des croyants pour l'égalité et la paix)
- Citizens' Movement for Democracy and Development (Mouvement Citoyen pour la Démocratie et le Développement)
- Communist Party of Togo (Parti Comuniste du Togo)
- Coordination of New Forces (Coordination des Forces Nouvelles)
- Democratic Alliance for the Fatherland (Alliance Démocratique pour la Patrie)
- Democratic Convention of African Peoples (Convention démocratique des peuples africains)
- Juvento
- Movement of Centrist Republicans (Mouvement des républicains centristes)
- New Popular Dynamic (Nouvelle Dynamique Populaire)
- New Togolese Commitment (Nouvel Engagement Togolais)
- Organisation to Build a United Togo (Organisation pour bâtir dans l’union un Togo solidaire)
- Pan-African Democratic Party (Parti démocratique panafricain)
- Pan-African Patriotic Convergence (Convergence patriotique panafricaine)
- Party for Democracy and Renewal (Parti pour la Démocratie et le Renouveau)
- Party for Renewal and Redemption (Parti pour le Renouveau et la Rédemption)
- Party of Action for Change in Togo (Parti d’Action pour le Changement au Togo)
- Party of the Union for Renovation and Development (Parti d'Union pour la Rénovation et le Développement)
- Patriotic Movement for Democracy and Development (Mouvement patriotique pour la democratie et la développement)
- Popular Union for the Republic (Union Populaire pour la République)
- Rally for the Support of Democracy and Development (Rassemblement pour le soutien de la démocratie et du développement)
- Regrouping of the Live Forces of Youth for Change (Regroupement des Forces Vives de la Jeunesse pour le Changement)
- Socialist Pact for Renewal (Pacte Socialiste pour le Renouveau)
- The Nest (Le Nid)
- Togolese Alliance of Democrats (Alliance Togolaise des Démocrates)
- Union for Democracy and Social Progress (Union pour la démocratie et le progrès social)
- Union of Forces for Change (Union des forces du changement)
- Union of Socialist Democrats of Togo (Union des Démocrates Socialistes du Togo)

== Defunct parties ==
- Rally for the Togolese People (Rassemblement du Peuple Togolais)
- Democratic Front for the Liberation of Togo (Front Démocratique pour la Libération du Togo)
- Democratic Union of the Togolese People (Union Démocratique des Populations Togolaises)
- Socialist Revolution Party of Benin (Parti de la Révolution Socialiste du Bénin)
- Togolese Party of Progress (Parti togolais du progrès)
- Togolese People's Movement (Mouvement Popularie Togolais)
- Togolese Union for Democracy (Union togolaise pour la démocratie)
- Union for Justice and Democracy (Union pour la Justice et la Démocratie)
- Union of Chiefs and Peoples of the North (Union des Chefs et des Populations du Nord)
- Workers' Party (Parti des travailleurs)

== See also ==
- Politics of Togo
- List of political parties by country
