= 2010 Togolese presidential election =

- 4 March 2010
- Registered: 3,227,492
- Turnout: 65.68% (▲2.10pp)
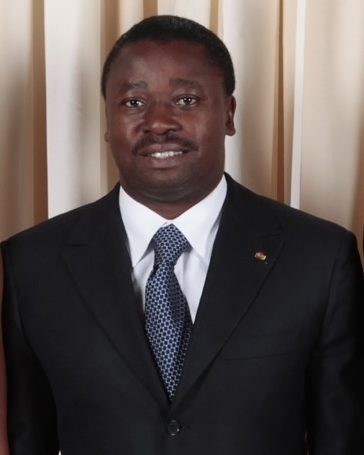

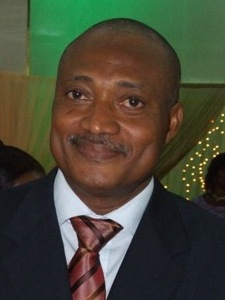
Nominee	Faure Gnassingbé	Jean-Pierre Fabre
Party	RPT	UFC
Popular vote	1,242,409	692,554
Percentage	60.89%	33.94%
President before election
Faure Gnassingbé
RPT
Elected President
Faure Gnassingbé
RPT

Presidential elections were held in Togo on 4 March 2010. Incumbent President Faure Gnassingbé—who won his first term in a presidential election that followed the death of his father, long-time President Gnassingbé Eyadema, in 2005—faced radical opposition candidate Jean-Pierre Fabre, the Secretary-General of the Union of the Forces of Change (UFC), as well as several minor opposition candidates.

Following the democratization process of the early 1990s, which proved largely abortive, Eyadema and his ruling party, the Rally of the Togolese People (RPT), successively won all presidential elections, although those elections were always extremely controversial: the opposition boycotted the 1993 presidential election altogether, and it claimed that Eyadema won the 1998 presidential election and the 2003 presidential election only through fraud. Eyadema died in 2005 and his son Faure Gnassingbé then ran as the RPT candidate; although he officially won the election, the opposition again disputed the result, and serious violence erupted.

Ahead of the 2010 election, the Togolese government took steps to increase the credibility of the electoral process and reassure the international community that the election would be free and fair. It placed a particular priority on avoiding the violence that marred the 2005 election. Gnassingbé stood for a second term as the candidate of the RPT, while the UFC designated Fabre as its candidate due to health problems suffered by its president, Gilchrist Olympio. Although the UFC was the largest opposition party by a large measure, and although the election was to be decided in a single round on a first past the post basis, the other opposition parties largely refused to rally behind Fabre and chose to nominate their own candidates.

Provisional results showed Gnassingbé winning the election with 61% of the vote, while Fabre trailed with 34%. The opposition again alleged fraud, denouncing the method by which the results were transmitted to the electoral commission, and subsequently held regular protests in Lomé. The results were confirmed by the Constitutional Court and Gnassingbé was sworn in for a second term on 3 May 2010.

== Background ==
The election was conducted by the Independent National Electoral Commission (CENI). The 17 members of CENI were sworn in on 1 September 2009; it was composed of five representatives of the ruling Rally of the Togolese People (RPT), five representatives of the parliamentary opposition, three representatives of the extra-parliamentary opposition, three representatives of civil society, and one representative of the administration. Henri Kolani, a representative of the extra-parliamentary opposition, was then elected as President of CENI, but the parliamentary opposition objected to his election. At a press conference on 18 September 2009, Kolani announced an electoral schedule: preparations for the election would begin in October 2009, the official election campaign period would run from 13 to 26 February 2010, and the election would be held on 28 February 2010. He stressed that hard work was necessary to ensure that the election was held before the constitutional deadline. The parliamentary opposition ignored Kolani's announcement.

The controversy over the election of Kolani interfered with CENI's work, and as a result, Issifou Tabiou Taffa—a representative of civil society—was elected by consensus as President of CENI on 14 October 2009, resolving the controversy. Tabiou Taffa was not a member of any political party and was an obscure figure at the time of his election as CENI President. On that occasion, he stressed that CENI's work would be "collegial".

On 23 December 2009, the European Union announced a grant of six billion CFA francs (9.1 million euro) to Togo in order to facilitate the organization of "free, just, transparent and peaceful elections, in line with international standards" and to "strengthen the capacities" of CENI and the High Authority for the Audiovisual Sector and Communications for future elections.

As the election drew nearer, greater government activity and social spending was observed; infrastructure was built or improved and recruitment to the civil service was increased. Speaking on TVT on 30 December 2009, Pascal Bodjona, the Minister of State for Territorial Administration, said that the government was merely doing what was best for the people and that the government's work was unrelated to the election.

The EU committed to sending an additional five billion CFA francs at a meeting with the Togolese government on 22 January 2010, and it announced on 1 February that it would have 122 observers present for the election.

On 11 February 2010, the election was delayed from 28 February to 4 March at the request of the opposition. As a result of the delay, the campaign period was modified and set to run from 16 February to 2 March. CENI President Tabiou Taffa announced the official opening of the campaign, set to begin at midnight, on 15 February. In his statement, he said that revisions of the voter list had produced "a reliable voter list of 3,295,646 voters". He also urged the opposition representatives to return to CENI, which they had abandoned in protest.

The security forces voted on 1 March—three days before the general population—so that they would be available to maintain order on election day.

== Candidates ==
Togo's main opposition party, the UFC, unanimously chose Olympio, its long-time leader, as its presidential candidate at the party's Second Ordinary Congress, held in Nyékonakpoé, Lomé on 18–19 July 2008. Some other early announced candidates were the minor opposition leader Dahuku Péré, who led the Democratic Alliance for the Fatherland, as well as Kofi Yamgnane, who held dual nationality and served in the government of France under François Mitterrand.

The Democratic Convention of African Peoples (CDPA) designated Kafui Adjamagbo-Johnson, a member of its steering committee, as its presidential candidate in early January 2010. She was the first woman to stand as a presidential candidate in Togo. At a meeting of its National Council, with 350 delegates in attendance, the Pan-African Democratic Party (PDP), a minor party, invested the university professor Bassabi Kagbara as its presidential candidate on 9 January 2010.

Although RPT activists, both in Togo and abroad, called for President Faure Gnassingbé to run for re-election over the course of several months, he deferred any formal announcement of his candidacy. It was nevertheless assumed that he would run for re-election and that he would be confirmed as the RPT candidate at a party convention at the Palace of Congress in Lomé on 12 January 2010. He was accordingly invested as the RPT candidate at the convention, although he was not present; his Personal Representative, Folly Bazi Katari, confirmed that he accepted the nomination in accordance with "the wishes of the overwhelming majority of Togolese". Speaking on the occasion, RPT Secretary-General Solitoki Esso credited Gnassingbé with vast accomplishments, saying that—among other things—he had improved the political atmosphere, organized transparent elections, ended Togo's international isolation, and revitalized the economy. He also credited Gnassingbé with various accomplishments in the areas of health, education, infrastructure, employment, and social welfare.

Agbéyomé Kodjo, a former Prime Minister leading the opposition Organisation to Build a United Togo (OBUTS), submitted his candidacy to CENI on 14 January 2010. Although the deadline for the submission of candidacies was 15 January, Kodjo was the first person to formally submit his candidacy. Upon learning that he was first, Kodjo declared that it was "a very good sign" and that he would also be "the first" to be declared the winner of the election. Kodjo fiercely denounced Gnassingbé's "disastrous" record, saying that the state budget needed to be increased, and he pledged "no fewer than 21 emergency measures to restore confidence and boost consumer spending after the presidential election".

On 15 January, long-time opposition leader Yawovi Agboyibo was formally invested as the candidate of the CAR.

Eight candidates submitted applications to CENI by the deadline of 15 January: Gnassingbé as the RPT candidate, Jean-Pierre Fabre as the UFC candidate, Agboyibo as the CAR candidate, Kodjo as the OBUTS candidate, Adjamagbo-Johnson as the CDPA candidate, Nicolas Lawson as the PRR candidate, Yamgnane as the Sursaut candidate, and Kagbara as the PDP candidate. The candidates were predictable except for Fabre, whose designation as the UFC candidate was considered very surprising. UFC President Olympio, whose candidacy had long been announced and expected, was in the United States at the time, suffering from backache, and was unable to travel to Togo to undergo the necessary medical review for his candidacy. Consequently, the UFC submitted the candidacy of its Secretary-General, Jean-Pierre Fabre.

Aside from Olympio, two candidacies were rejected: those of Dahuku Péré and Kokou Ségnon Nsoukpoe. According to CENI, neither of them submitted the necessary deposits of money.

In a letter published on the UFC website on 16 January, Olympio said that the election should not be rushed and that CENI should be given "the time necessary for the preparation of a credible and transparent election". He said that his health was "rapidly improving" and that the authorities were considering his application. The letter made no mention of Fabre's candidacy.

On 2 February 2010, the Constitutional Court validated the candidacies of seven of the eight candidates who were initially accepted by CENI. The only candidate rejected by the Constitutional Court was Kofi Yamgnane, who held joint dual nationality: the Court cited a contradiction between the date of birth given in his French documents (11 October 1945) and the date given in his Togolese documents (31 December 1945). According to the Court, the contradiction was "of a nature to cause confusion over the identity of the person and consequently to weaken the legal and judicial security inherent in the highest office in the country". Yamgnane denounced the ruling, claiming its real motivation was to exclude "the most dangerous candidate for the RPT". Initially he vowed to appeal, but that was impossible because the judgments of the Constitutional Court were final; he then said that his only recourse was to "mobilize the street". He also said that, although the RPT imagined that it would "remain in power eternally", "we have the means to ensure that change happens in 2010 in Togo".

PRR President Nicolas Lawson, who was confirmed as a candidate, expressed his willingness to work with whichever candidate won the election. He also praised the peaceful atmosphere and harshly denounced the UFC President, saying that Olympio "always embodied violence, malice, and revenge, and I am very happy that he is not a candidate because his influence on Togo was fatal".

Reacting to the Constitutional Court's decision to validate his candidacy, UFC Secretary-General Fabre said that it was "unquestionably a message of hope for the Togolese people who aspire to a profound change". He also stressed that Olympio "embodies, more than any other, the ideals and values of our party" and that his own candidacy represented a commitment to continuing Olympio's work. Seeking to give the impression of solidarity amidst perceptions of internal disagreement, UFC First Vice-president Patrick Lawson said that the party was totally united behind Fabre's candidacy.

Speaking on 9 February, Yamgnane said that he would meet six candidates (all except Gnassingbé) in Paris with the goal of reaching an agreement on a single opposition candidate, which would increase the opposition's chances of defeating Gnassingbé. He said that it would be most intuitive to select Fabre as the single candidate, although he stressed that was a "logical preference" rather than a "personal preference". The meeting of candidates was facilitated by François Boko, a former Interior Minister. It was largely unsuccessful, however, as the CAR candidate Agboyibo and the CDPA candidate Adjamagbo-Johnson both abandoned the effort. In a statement on 9 February, CDPA Secretary-General Léopold Gnininvi condemned the "cavalier" way the meeting was conducted, expressing annoyance that it was taken for granted that the candidates would all rally behind Fabre.

Despite the failure to reach a consensus among the candidates, Agbéyomé Kodjo decided to withdraw his candidacy and rally behind Fabre, while Yamgnane also backed Fabre's candidacy. They agreed on the creation on a coalition called the Republican Front for Change and the Alternance to support Fabre; Kodjo was designated as the Front's campaign director, while Yamgnane was designated as its campaign spokesman.

In an interview on 13 February, Jean-Claude Homawoo, who was one of the UFC's three representatives on CENI, insisted that Olympio was the legitimate UFC candidate because he, unlike Fabre, had been nominated by a party congress in 2008. He also claimed that the UFC was divided between Olympio loyalists and reformists, and he stated that he personally did not support Fabre's candidacy. According to Homawoo, Olympio was not suffering from an illness but rather was recovering from a fall down a flight of stairs, in which he broke his knee and bruised his back and neck. Kodjo, speaking on 14 February, also criticized the UFC's decision to withdraw from CENI work as well as the apparent dissension affecting the party leadership. He stressed that OBUTS did not support any boycott of the election.

Agboyibo and Adjamagbo-Johnson announced on 15 February 2010 that they were suspending their candidacies, citing their still unresolved concerns about the voter rolls. Speaking on 15 February, PRR candidate Nicolas Lawson denounced the opposition, saying that Togo was cursed with the "most stupid and criminal opposition in the sub-region". According to Lawson, the opposition was a "band of thugs" with "no program and national vision" that "must disappear from the political landscape". Kodjo, dissatisfied with the UFC's behavior, announced on 15 February that he was reactivating his candidacy.

In an interview with the news agency Agence France-Presse in mid-February 2010, Faure Gnassingbé stressed the importance of having a well-organized election free of violence. Acknowledging that the violence of the 2005 presidential election was "traumatic for many people", he said that the 2010 election would be a "big test" and that a victory under violent conditions would "almost be meaningless". Gnassingbé also said he regretted the absence of Gilchrist Olympio in the election because Olympio had "a rightful place in politics."

== Campaign ==
On 17 February, four minor opposition groups—ADDI, the Alliance, the Socialist Renewal Party (PSR), and SURSAUT—joined the UFC in backing Fabre's candidacy. Together they reconstituted the opposition coalition as the Republican Front for the Alternance and Change (FRAC); Yamgnane remained its campaign spokesman, while Patrick Lawson was designated as campaign director. FRAC called on the CAR and OBUTS to join the coalition. Fabre said in an interview on 17 February that the coalition represented a majority of the opposition's electorate and that, in reference to the other parties, "it is up to them to join us"; expressing some exasperation, he said that "the ego is so strong in Togo that everyone thinks he can be President". He nevertheless said discussions would continue with the other parties and also insisted, in reaction to suggestions that the UFC was divided, that Olympio supported his candidacy. Regarding the UFC's suspended participation in CENI, he said that the UFC representatives would return to the body because it would be preposterous to participate in the election while boycotting the electoral commission.

Gnassingbé launched his campaign in Atakpamé on 18 February 2010. On that occasion he asked the people to put their trust in him "to ensure a better future for all Togolese". Fabre launched his campaign in Lomé on 19 February. Speaking in Gnassingbé Eyadema's native region of Kara on 21 February, Kodjo said that, before breaking with President Eyadema in 2002, he was Eyadema's intended successor.

Olympio broke his silence, which was the subject of much speculation, in a letter published on 21 February. In that letter, he expressed confidence in Fabre and told his supporters: "I will never forget the moments of enthusiasm and confidence you have always shown in all circumstances, and I thank you forever." In a radio interview on 23 February, however, he stressed that he was still in charge of the UFC. Regarding his delayed and arguably unenthusiastic endorsement of Fabre, he said that it had been necessary to consult with other political actors before backing Fabre, and he pointed to his health as the reason he was unable to accompany Fabre on the campaign trail.

Nicolas Lawson alleged on 24 February that Gnassingbé was abusing state resources in the course of his campaign.

Gnassingbé concluded his campaign with a rally in Kara on 2 March. On that occasion, he said that "the campaign has been exemplary for all candidates" and expressed certainty that the results would match the will of the people. He urged everyone in Togo to respect the results.

During the campaign, the RPT distributed rice at a cost far below market value ("Faure rice"). The rice distribution was interpreted by many as a way of bribing people to vote for Gnassingbé. Fabre's supporters responded to the alleged bribery by chanting "we were not paid to be here" at campaign rallies. Bodjona, the Government Spokesman, dismissed the allegations of bribery; he said that the rice and other items were donated to the campaign by some of Gnassingbé's supporters.

Gnassingbé's campaign posters and billboards were seemingly omnipresent in Lomé, vastly outnumbering those from the opposition. In its election report, the EU observer mission accused the RPT of exceeding the legal limit for campaign spending (around $100,000), but Bodjona said that claim was untrue.

== Controversies ==
=== Election rules ===
In accordance with a 2002 constitutional amendment, the 2010 election will be decided in a single round of voting; the candidate with the highest number of votes—even if that number is less than 50%—wins the election without any need for a second round. The two main opposition parties, the Union of the Forces of Change (UFC) and the Action Committee for Renewal (CAR), strongly protested the single-round system.

UFC President Gilchrist Olympio insisted that the election should be held in two rounds, with the top two candidates in the first round proceeding to a second round. A two-round system could work to the UFC's benefit; as the main opposition party, its candidate might expect to place second in the first round and then win in the second round by obtaining the support of other opposition candidates who were defeated in the first round. (Abdoulaye Wade won the 2000 presidential election in Senegal in that manner.) Speaking before a crowd of hundreds of UFC supporters on 6 December 2009, Olympio warned that the UFC would not participate in the election if there was only one round and that "if the UFC does not participate, there will be no election in Togo."

In addition to its demand for a two-round system, the opposition sought a decrease in the deposit that candidates were required to pay; the amount was equivalent to about 44,000 dollars. Another opposition demand was the revision of the voter rolls. On 25 January 2010, six opposition candidates and three parties called for a resumption of the revision of the voter rolls as well as a delay of the election; they also argued that Gnassingbé was conducting an unofficial campaign before the start of the campaign period. Government Spokesman Pascal Bodjona dismissed the opposition concerns; he said that the voter rolls had been established prior to the 2007 parliamentary election and that it was up to CENI to decide whether to resume revising them. Regarding Gnassingbé's alleged unofficial campaigning, Bodjona argued that Gnassingbé, as president, was merely working for the people: "he will not starve the people because of the electoral process". Bodjona additionally argued that the opposition only wanted a delay because they were unprepared for the election.

In order to improve the voter rolls, CENI announced on 26 January that people could register to vote at a hundred points across the country on 31 January. RPT Secretary-General Solitoki Esso released a statement on 28 January in which he accused the opposition of using the issue of revising the voter rolls as a delaying tactic.

At talks in Ouagadougou, mediated by Burkinabé President Blaise Compaoré, the RPT and the two main opposition parties—the UFC and the CAR—were unable to reach an agreement on opposition demands, the foremost of which was the revision of the voter rolls. The opposition also wanted a delay in the election, although Compaoré felt that it was necessary to hold the vote "between 28 February and 5 March to stay within the constitutional timeframe". A slight delay was announced on 11 February, however, as the date was pushed back from 28 February to 4 March.

Citing continuing concerns about the voter rolls and fears that the election would be a "masquerade", the UFC notified CENI that its three representatives on CENI were suspending their participation on 11 February. When announcing the UFC's decision, CENI stressed that "the electoral process is proceeding normally". One of the UFC's CENI representatives, Jean-Claude Homawoo, refused to accept his party's decision and said that he would continue his work on CENI unless Olympio told him to stop.

=== Corruption ===
Vincent Bolloré, a French billionaire close to then-French president Nicolas Sarkozy, allegedly gave financial support to presidential candidate Faure Gnassingbé in the 2010 Togolese presidential election. He is suspected of having offered Gnassingbé discount on advertisements from his ad agency, which he didn't equally offer to his opponent Jean-Pierre Fabre. Gnassingbé went on to become Togolese president and gave Bolloré's company port concessions. Bolloré formally denies any wrongdoing.

== Conduct ==
In light of the violence that followed the 2005 election, it was particularly important to CENI that the election proceed peacefully. Speaking on 3 March, CENI President Taffa Tabiou noted that campaigning, which had concluded late on the previous day, was conducted amidst "calm and serenity", and he expressed CENI's commitment "to organising a just, fair and transparent election devoid of violence, to ensure that Togo ... finds its place in the comity of modern democracies".

A peaceful vote was also strongly desired by the government and the RPT, which sought to avoid the opprobrium associated with perceptions of a flawed election and repression of the opposition. Togo had suffered from international isolation during the latter phase of President Eyadema's rule due to the widespread belief that he had rigged elections and employed violence against the opposition; the 2005 election, which followed Eyadema's death, served to only amplify those concerns, but afterward Eyadema's son made a concerted effort to project a better image internationally. The creation of an independent electoral commission was noted by the Western media, as was the "fair" coverage given by the government's news website to opposition candidates.

In light of the emphasis on having a peaceful vote, security forces had a heavy presence; 3,000 police and 3,000 gendarmes were assigned the task of preventing electoral violence. There were also efforts to educate voters in the prevention of electoral violence.

Polls were open from 7:00 am (0700 GMT) to 5:00 pm (1700 GMT) on 4 March. Fabre, who voted in Lomé, said on the occasion that "during the campaign, I went round the country and heard a distress call, a desire for change", and he warned the government to not rig the election: "The people will make sure their vote will not be changed." Voting proceeded peacefully and without incident, but the UFC immediately began pointing to issues that it identified as irregularities, such as the absence of serial numbers on the ballot papers.

Amidst an atmosphere of deep distrust, a post-election controversy rapidly developed regarding the means of transmitting results to CENI. Seeking to establish a reliable transmission method, a delegation from the European Union had met with Gnassingbé on 3 March and obtained his last-minute agreement to use the VSAT satellite system to transmit the results directly from each polling station. CENI accepted the use of the satellite system alongside text messaging and faxing. However, following the vote, Taffa Tabiou said on 5 March that the VSAT machines had failed and that it would therefore be necessary for all 35 electoral district directors to bring physical proof of the results to Lomé. That was unacceptable to the UFC, which said that results not transmitted through VSAT could not be trusted; it claimed that the machines had not failed but were simply switched off by the government.

Fabre held a press conference on 5 March to declare victory, claiming that he had won about 75–80% of the vote; he also accused the RPT of electoral fraud and said that the results being sent to CENI had no credibility. Later on the same day, Bodjona, the Government Spokesman, claimed that Gnassingbé had won "resoundingly". Lomé remained calm but also tense in the absence of official results. Some opposition supporters threatened violence if Fabre was not declared the winner and chanted "change or death". RPT Secretary-General Esso accused the UFC of making false claims about the results and said that it was laying the groundwork for violence.

Despite the opposition's complaints, district officials followed Taffa Tabiou's instructions in bringing their results to Lomé. Those results only indicated the total votes for each district; they did not include specific counts from each polling station, and the officials did not bring actual ballots. Jean-Claude Codjo, one of the opposition's representatives on CENI, argued the system was unacceptable because each set of results being presented to CENI merely constituted a "synthesis": "I have no way of knowing if these numbers that are being read out are real." Codjo left the CENI meeting in protest, along with another of the opposition's representatives.

Results from 20 of the constituencies were counted by mid-day on 6 March, showing Gnassingbé leading Fabre by a margin of 52% to 43%; the results followed the typical regional breakdown of elections in Togo, with the RPT dominating the north and the UFC receiving the bulk of its support in the south. Seeing that the results were going Gnassingbé's way, a group of Fabre's supporters protested in Lomé, but the protest was broken up with tear gas.

Taffa Tabiou announced full provisional results late on 6 March. Those results showed Gnassingbé winning the election with 60.9% of the vote (1,243,044 votes), far ahead of Fabre, who received 33.94% (692,584 votes). Yawovi Agboyibo trailed in a distant third place with 2.96%. According to Taffa Tabiou, voter turnout was 64.68%. Significantly, the turnout varied greatly by region: it was 70–80% in the north—the RPT's stronghold—but far lower in the traditionally pro-UFC south (including Lomé).

Jean-Claude Homawoo, an opposition representative on CENI, said that opposition supporters were totally disillusioned with the electoral process: "So many times we went and voted in elections we knew we had won, only for the opposite result to be declared. So people have become tired. They don't believe their vote counts anymore." Esso, the RPT Secretary-General, described the result as "great victory that gives us a lot of satisfaction and wipes off any doubts about the process", while Bodjona dismissed the opposition as "bad losers". For its part, the EU observer mission released a report that noted the accusations of vote-buying by the RPT, but also suggested there was no evidence to support opposition claims of outright fraud.

Fabre alleged that the RPT had told his supporters that their fingerprints on the ballots could be traced and that they could therefore be hunted down and punished for their votes. He also repeated the accusations of vote-buying and "massive" fraud. Declaring that he was "ready to die", Fabre led a group of UFC supporters in a protest on 7 March: "We're going to make them exhaust their stock of tear gas. We cannot let this go on, otherwise they'll hang on to power for the next 200 years." Although UFC supporters formed a protective cordon around Fabre, he was sprayed with tear gas and the protesters were forced to disperse, fleeing back to the UFC headquarters.

Reacting to the previous day's protests, the security forces formed a blockade around UFC headquarters on 8 March. Fabre, trying to reach his office, was initially barred from entry, but after an hour he was allowed through the blockade. The UFC announced that it would hold a large protest on 9 March to press for a review of the results; however, the protest was thwarted by the police. Also on 9 March, Fabre alleged that the security forces searched the UFC headquarters, seized computers, and arrested party members, interfering with the party's efforts to prepare evidence of fraud.

Lawson, the PRR candidate, grudgingly accepted Gnassingbé's re-election on 8 March, but he nevertheless alleged fraud: "The vote was so expertly stolen by the ruling party that electoral observers will never understand what really happened." Bassabi Kagbara, the PDP candidate, reacted to the official results—according to which he received only 0.41% of the vote—on 9 March; he said that he did not recognize the results, but also appealed for "calm and dialogue".

In an interview on 11 March, Gilbert Bawara, the Minister of Cooperation, criticized Fabre. He said that Fabre should not expect the Togolese people to trust him when he did not trust others, and he argued that Fabre's claims of victory were ridiculous, noting that Fabre initially claimed a score of 75–80% but later claimed a lesser figure of 55–60%. According to Bawara, Gnassingbé would consider the fact that Fabre had received a respectable number of votes; Bawara observed that Fabre's score of 34% was particularly impressive because he had not been envisioned as a presidential candidate before January 2010. However, he also said that Fabre lacked experience and did not do serious work in the National Assembly.

Supporters of Gnassingbé and Fabre both held marches in Lomé on 13 March. The marches were peaceful and did not confront one another, taking different paths through the city.

== Results ==
On 18 March, the Constitutional Court confirmed the results and declared that Gnassingbé had been elected president, rejecting five appeals from the opposition. The results confirmed by the Constitutional Court were nearly identical to those previously released by CENI, although both of the main candidates were credited with slightly reduced totals. Decisions of the Constitutional Court are not subject to appeal, and thus the decision of 18 March marked the conclusion of "all the electoral processes". Speaking on behalf of Fabre and the FRAC coalition, Patrick Lawson denounced the Constitutional Court's decision and described Fabre as "the elected President". He urged the people "to stand opposed to this electoral hold-up" and "remain mobilized until the restitution of power to Jean-Pierre Fabre".

Candidate	Party	Votes	%
Faure Gnassingbé	Rally of the Togolese People	1,242,409	60.89
Jean-Pierre Fabre	Union of Forces for Change	692,554	33.94
Yawovi Agboyibo	Action Committee for Renewal	60,370	2.96
Agbéyomé Kodjo	Organisation to Build a United Togo	17,393	0.85
Kafui Adjamagbo-Johnson	Democratic Convention of African Peoples	13,452	0.66
Bassabi Kagbara	Pan-African Democratic Party	8,341	0.41
Nicolas Lawson	Party for Renewal and Redemption	6,027	0.30
Total		2,040,546	100.00
Valid votes		2,040,546	96.26
Invalid/blank votes		79,283	3.74
Total votes		2,119,829	100.00
Registered voters/turnout		3,227,492	65.68
Source: Constitutional Court

== Aftermath ==
In the period following the Court's decision, the FRAC coalition continued to hold protests on a weekly basis. A protest on 24 March 2010 was marked by clashes between the protesters and the police, and the opposition said that 30 people suffered injuries as a result. Thousands of Fabre's supporters participated in a protest held in Lomé on 10 April 2010. Late on 14 April, the security forces prevented a planned candlelight vigil on the grounds that it had not received a permit. Around 70 people who were present at the UFC headquarters were detained and questioned. According to the security forces, the questioning was necessary because some of those present "were individuals from neighbouring countries" who intended "to breach public order".

Tensions between the Fabre and Olympio factions of the UFC remained evident after the election. UFC militants, allegedly acting on instructions from Fabre and other UFC leaders, threw stones at a motorcade carrying Olympio to a protest in mid-April 2010, and Olympio, protected by security forces, then returned home. Some of those involved said that they had thrown stones because Jean-Claude Homawoo—the CENI representative who had, in the eyes of Fabre supporters, demonstrated disloyalty during the run-up to the election—was present in the motorcade, but Homawoo said that he was not even in Togo at the time. Later in the month, Olympio reiterated his support for Fabre's candidacy.

Fabre supporters held another protest on 1 May 2010. On that occasion, Fabre called on the people to wear yellow (the party color of the UFC) on 3 May, the date Gnassingbé was scheduled to be sworn in, as a symbolic gesture of protest. He expressed continued resolve and confidence that he would take power within weeks.

Gnassingbé was sworn in for his second term on 3 May 2010 at a ceremony in the presence of several other African leaders. Prime Minister Gilbert Houngbo, a technocrat first appointed by Gnassingbé in 2008, resigned on 5 May; Gnassingbé re-appointed him as Prime Minister on 7 May.

The reappointment of Houngbo was followed by negotiations between the government and the UFC, with Olympio's approval, regarding UFC participation in the government. This marked a distinct change in attitude for the UFC, as it had previously always taken a hard line against the RPT regime and refused to participate in the government. After a few weeks, Olympio announced on 27 May 2010 that he had signed an agreement with RPT Secretary-General Solitoki Esso that provided for the inclusion of seven UFC ministers in "a government of national reconstruction", along with various electoral reforms sought by the UFC. The agreed reforms included the redrawing of constituencies (the existing boundaries tended to favor the RPT), a new census, and the revision of the voter rolls. Olympio said that he would chair a committee to monitor matters related to the agreement. Later on the same day, Houngbo confirmed that an agreement had been reached on the inclusion of seven UFC ministers and electoral reforms.

Highlighting the continuing differences between the Olympio and Fabre factions of the UFC, Fabre expressed disapproval for Olympio's decision on 27 May, saying that Olympio was acting contrary to the wishes of the UFC National Bureau.

With the agreement concluded, Gnassingbé appointed Houngbo's new government on 28 May 2010; it included 31 ministers, seven of whom were members of the UFC. Powerful Gnassingbé loyalists like Pascal Bodjona remained in the government, while Solitoki Esso was also brought back into the government as Minister of State for the Civil Service and Administrative Reform. Acting under Fabre's direction, the UFC National Bureau immediately met on 28 May and subjected Olympio—the UFC's founder and President—to a "temporary expulsion" for violating party discipline. The UFC members appointed to the government were also temporarily expelled. UFC first vice-president Patrick Lawson was present but reportedly did not approve of the decision reached by the National Bureau. Fabre continued to express a hard-line position, declaring that he was robbed of victory through fraud and was the elected president.

The expulsion of Olympio was apparently not accepted by the whole party, as the UFC website remained under the control of Olympio loyalists. In a statement on 29 May, the website derided Fabre and his supporters; it said that Fabre was not the "elected President" and that he did not control the UFC. According to the statement, it was impossible to expel the party's founder-president, who had been re-elected to his post as recently as July 2008, without holding an extraordinary congress to approve such a weighty decision. Despite the rift, the statement still acknowledged that Fabre was "in his place" as Secretary-General of the UFC, while asserting that Olympio remained the UFC's president.

The agreement struck between the government and Olympio was highly symbolic, given Olympio's long history of radical opposition to Gnassingbé Eyadema and his son, and it significantly bolstered Faure Gnassingbé's claim to be working for political reconciliation, openness, and cooperation. Nevertheless, some observers suggested that the agreement would have little practical effect, arguing that Olympio was largely distant from his party's operations.

Two large rallies were held in Lomé on 29 May 2010. Thousands participated in a rally to express support for Gnassingbé and his "policy of reconciliation", while thousands of Fabre supporters rallied to denounce Olympio for compromising with the RPT regime. Describing Olympio as a traitor, the demonstrators vowed to continue their struggle. Fabre said that Olympio would face the UFC's disciplinary council and that he could be permanently expelled from the party.
