= Komlan Mally =

Togolese politician and former Prime Minister

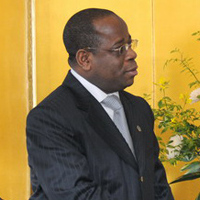

9th Prime Minister of Togo
- In office 6 December 2007 – 8 September 2008
- President: Faure Gnassingbé
- Preceded by: Yawovi Agboyibo
- Succeeded by: Gilbert Houngbo

Personal details
- Born: 12 December 1960 (age 65) Adiva, Togo
- Party: Rally of the Togolese People

Komlan Mally (born 12 December 1960) is a Togolese politician who served as Prime Minister of Togo from December 2007 to September 2008. He was Minister of State for Health from September 2008 to June 2011.

== Early life and political career ==
Mally was born in Adiva in Amou Prefecture, part of Plateaux Region. He was a member of the Rally of the Togolese People (RPT) and part of its Central Committee. He served as Prefect of Wawa Prefecture from March 1996 to October 1999, and subsequently he was Prefect of Golfe Prefecture from 2002 to 2006. In September 2006 he was appointed Minister of Town and City Planning in the government of Prime Minister Yawovi Agboyibo, in which position he served until December 2007. He was elected as an RPT candidate to the National Assembly in the October 2007 parliamentary election from Amou Prefecture.

== As Prime Minister and Minister of State ==
Following the 2007 election, Mally was appointed as prime minister by President Faure Gnassingbé on December 3, 2007. At the time of his appointment he was considered a relative unknown in Togolese politics, and his appointment was contrary to expectations that an opposition figure would be named prime minister. Gilchrist Olympio of the opposition Union of the Forces of Change (UFC) described Mally as "some sort of civil servant, unknown to the public, unknown to the political class", and predicted that Mally's government would be short-lived due to the talks between Gnassingbé and the opposition.

Mally took office in a ceremony on December 6, and his government was named on December 13. It included 21 ministers (aside from Mally himself) and was primarily composed of members of the RPT; the two main opposition parties, the Union of the Forces of Change (UFC) and the Action Committee for Renewal (CAR), were not included in the government. Mally addressed the National Assembly with his policy programme on December 17, in which he said that the four main priorities of his government would be "consolidation of the Togolese nation; formation of solid bases of growth and development; improvement of the conditions of access to the essential services; and the reaffirmation of Togo's place in the community of nations." The programme was approved by the National Assembly with 42 votes in favor, 41 from the RPT and one from the CAR; three deputies from the CAR voted against it and the UFC did not participate in the vote. The UFC refused to vote on the grounds that there was not enough time given to analyze the programme; it also felt that, because 10 UFC deputies requested that the vote on the programme be conducted through secret ballot, it was a violation of procedure to not use a secret ballot.

Mally submitted his resignation on 5 September 2008, and Gnassingbé accepted it. According to a press release from the presidency, "the main task of [Mally's] government was to renew our country's links with the international community", and it said that Mally's government had accomplished this goal, opening Togo "to new opportunities". Gnassingbé congratulated Mally and his government. Gilbert Houngbo was appointed to replace Mally on 7 September, and he succeeded Mally on 8 September. There were suggestions that Mally was replaced due to a perception that he was a weak prime minister with little control over his government; another factor may have been a desire to improve the government's image through the appointment of a technocrat as prime minister.

In Houngbo's government, which was named on 15 September 2008, Mally was included as Minister of State for Health.

Mally actively participated in the RPT campaign for Gnassingbé's re-election in the March 2010 presidential election. At a rally in his hometown of Hihéyatro on 17 February 2010, Mally urged people to vote for Gnassingbé so that he could continue "projects in the areas of health, infrastructure and education".

Mally was dismissed from the government on 16 June 2011, and Charles Kondi Agba was appointed to succeed him at the Ministry of Health.

== Family ==
As of 2008, Mally has a newborn son named Thomas.

Political offices
Preceded by Yawovi Agboyibo	Prime Minister of Togo; 2007 – 2008	Succeeded by Gilbert Houngbo
