= Edem Kodjo =

Togolese politician and diplomat (1938–2020)

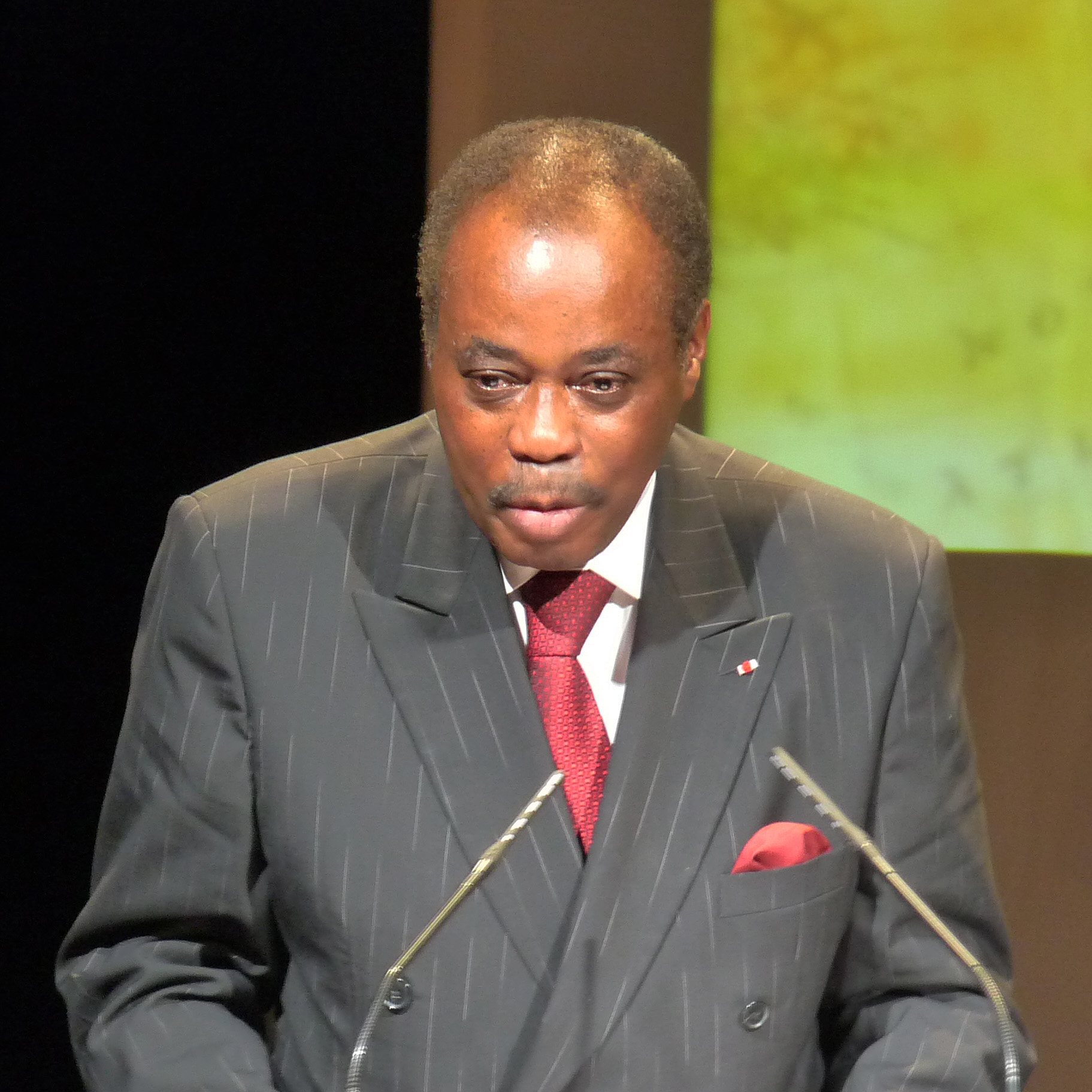
- Kodjo in 2011

4th Secretary-General of the Organisation of African Unity
- In office 21 July 1978 – 12 June 1983
- Preceded by: William Eteki
- Succeeded by: Peter Onu

3rd Prime Minister of Togo
- In office 9 June 2005 – 20 September 2006
- President: Faure Gnassingbé
- Preceded by: Koffi Sama
- Succeeded by: Yawovi Agboyibo
- In office 23 April 1994 – 20 August 1996
- President: Gnassingbé Eyadéma
- Preceded by: Joseph Kokou Koffigoh
- Succeeded by: Kwassi Klutse

President of the Pan-African Patriotic Convergence
- In office 15 August 1999 – 11 April 2020
- Vice President: Jean-Lucien Savi de Tové (1999–2007)
- Preceded by: Position established
- Succeeded by: Adrien Béléki Akouété

Personal details
- Born: Édouard Kodjovi Kodjo; 23 May 1938 Sokodé, Tchaoudjo, French Togoland
- Died: 11 April 2020 (aged 81) Paris, France
- Party: CPP (1999–2020)
- Other political affiliations: UDT (1991–1999)
- Profession: Administrator, teacher, writer, publisher

Édouard Kodjovi "Edem" Kodjo (23 May 1938 – 11 April 2020), was a Togolese politician and diplomat. He was Secretary-General of the Organisation of African Unity from 1978 to 1983; later, in Togo, he was a prominent opposition leader after the introduction of multi-party politics. He served as Prime Minister from 1994 to 1996 and again from 2005 to 2006. Kodjo was President of the Patriotic Pan-African Convergence (CPP). Kodjo died on 11 April 2020, in Paris.

== Early life ==
Kodjo was born in Sokodé, Tchaoudjo Prefecture, French Togoland on May 23, 1938. He had his secondary school education at West Africa Secondary School in Ghana.

== Career ==
=== Early career ===
After completing his studies in France, he was an administrator at the Office de Radiodiffusion Télévision Française from November 1964 to June 1967. He then returned to Togo and was appointed by President Gnassingbé Eyadéma as Secretary-General of the Ministry of Finance in July 1967. Kodjo participated in the creation of the Rally of the Togolese People (RPT) ruling party in late 1969 and became the new party's Secretary-General. He also wrote the "Green Book", which served as the ideological basis for the establishment of the RPT's single-party rule. He was removed from his position as RPT Secretary-General in 1971.

Kodjo served in Eyadéma's government as Minister of Finance from 1973 to 1977, and as Minister of Foreign Affairs from 1976 to 1978. He was elected as the Secretary-General of the Organisation of African Unity (OAU) at its summit in Khartoum on July 18–22, 1978. One of the key issues facing the OAU during Kodjo's five-year tenure was the status of the Sahrawi Arab Democratic Republic (SADR), which claimed independence for the former colony of Spanish Sahara, at that time partly occupied by Morocco. Kodjo controversially allowed the SADR to be seated as a member of the OAU on February 28, 1982, over the objections of Morocco and various other African countries that supported the Moroccan position. According to Kodjo, that decision was based simply on the fact that a majority of OAU member states had recognized the SADR, but it led to a serious crisis within the OAU, with a number of member states boycotting OAU meetings. Senegalese President Abdou Diouf accused Kodjo of "mischief-making".

After leaving his post as OAU Secretary-General in 1983, Kodjo lived in France, where he taught at the Sorbonne, wrote for Jeune Afrique, and founded a magazine, Afrique 2000. In 1985 he published Africa Tomorrow in France, which was later translated into English by E. B. Khan and published in the United States in 1987.

==== 1990s ====
In 1991, a few months before the National Conference, Kodjo returned to Togo and founded a new opposition political party, the Togolese Union for Democracy (UTD). On July 20, 1993, he was designated by the Collective of Democratic Opposition (COD II) as its sole candidate for the presidential election of August 25, 1993, although Gilchrist Olympio of the Union of the Forces of Change (UFC) did not accept this decision. Along with fellow opposition leaders Yawovi Agboyibo and Djobo Boukari, Kodjo announced on August 22 that he was withdrawing his candidacy and boycotting the election due to the number of registered voters being considered too high—a possible sign of preparations to rig the election.

Along with other opposition leaders, Kodjo pressured Eyadéma to hold a free and fair parliamentary election in 1994. In this election, the Action Committee for Renewal (CAR) and the UTD together won an initial majority in the National Assembly, the CAR with 36 seats and the UTD with seven; Kodjo himself won a seat from Lomé. The CAR and UTD initially agreed to nominate CAR President Yawovi Agboyibo as Prime Minister. However, after the election in three constituencies was cancelled, the two parties lost their narrow majority, and Eyadéma invited Kodjo to form a government, announcing his appointment as Prime Minister on April 22, 1994; he took office on April 25. The CAR regarded Kodjo's appointment as a violation of the parties' agreement and refused to participate in his government. His acceptance of the position of Prime Minister, in addition to his earlier role in the establishment of the RPT regime, discredited him in the eyes of many opposition supporters. His government was announced on May 25, 1994; it included the RPT, the UTD, and some smaller parties not represented in the National Assembly. Although headed by Kodjo, the composition of the government was strongly dominated by the RPT.

Kodjo served as Prime Minister of Togo until August 20, 1996. He resigned as Prime Minister after the RPT won the elections that were held over again in the constituencies where the results had been annulled, giving the RPT and its allies a parliamentary majority; a new government under Kwassi Klutse of the RPT was formed.

On the night of August 13, 1997, tear gas canisters were thrown at Kodjo's house while he was exiting it with guests. The UTD alleged that the canisters were thrown from a police vehicle. Kodjo announced on May 4, 1998 that he would not be a candidate in the June 1998 presidential election, stressing the need for opposition unity. He backed the leading opposition candidate, UFC President Gilchrist Olympio.

==== 2000–2020 ====
Kodjo subsequently became the leader of a new party, the Patriotic Pan-African Convergence (CPP), which was created in August 1999 through the merger of four parties, including the UTD. Kodjo ran as the CPP's candidate in the June 2003 presidential election. Kodjo criticized Eyadéma for not honoring his pledge to step down in the 2003 election and again called for the opposition to put forward a single candidate. During the campaign, the CPP called for a debate on television between Kodjo and Eyadéma after the RPT engaged in what the CPP considered personal attacks on Kodjo. In the election, Kodjo received 0.96% of the vote according to official results and took fifth place; he denounced the results as fraudulent.

Following the disputed April 2005 presidential election, which occurred shortly after Eyadema's death, Eyadema's son and successor Faure Gnassingbé named Kodjo, a representative of the moderate opposition, as Prime Minister again on June 8, 2005, choosing him instead of a candidate from the radical opposition. He took office on June 9, succeeding Koffi Sama.

In an announcement on September 16, 2006, Gnassingbé accepted Kodjo's resignation and named Yawovi Agboyibo as Prime Minister. On September 25, Gnassingbé appointed Kodjo by decree as Minister of State to the Presidency.

In the October 2007 parliamentary election, Kodjo ran for a seat in the National Assembly as a candidate of the CPP in Avé Prefecture, where he was the first name on the party's candidate list. The CPP did not win any seats in the election.

At a CPP congress in late April 2009, Kodjo announced that he was retiring from day-to-day politics in order to make way for younger leadership. He also said that he would not be a candidate in the 2010 presidential election. Acting as the Special Envoy of La Francophonie, he arrived in Madagascar to help mediate in that country's political crisis on May 8, 2009. In an interview with Jeune Afrique, published in May 2009, he said that he had served his country in all possible capacities, except that of President: "I have made my contribution to the construction of my country". According to Kodjo, he had lost interest in "internal politics" and preferred to devote himself to Pan-Africanism by working to facilitate a cooperative approach to finding solutions to African problems.

In 2016 he acted as the African Union's mediator during the dispute between the government and the opposition in the Democratic Republic of the Congo regarding the timing of the next election.

== Death ==
Kodjo died of COVID-19 on April 11, 2020, in Paris, France. The Togolese Foreign Minister Robert Dussey paid tribute to him, calling him "a brilliant academic".

Political offices
Preceded by Joseph Kokou Koffigoh	Prime Minister of Togo; 1994–1996	Succeeded by Kwassi Klutse
Preceded by Koffi Sama	Prime Minister of Togo; 2005–2006	Succeeded by Yawovi Agboyibo
