= Yawovi Agboyibo =

Togolese attorney and politician (1943–2020)

8th Prime Minister of Togo
- In office 16 September 2006 – 6 December 2007
- President: Faure Gnassingbé
- Preceded by: Edem Kodjo
- Succeeded by: Komlan Mally

Personal details
- Born: 31 December 1943 Yoto Prefecture, Togo
- Died: 30 May 2020 (aged 76) Paris, France
- Party: CAR

Yawovi Madji Agboyibo (31 December 1943 – 30 May 2020) was a Togolese attorney and politician. He served as Prime Minister of Togo from September 2006 to December 2007 and was National President of the Action Committee for Renewal (CAR), an opposition political party, from 1991 to 2008. He was the Honorary President of the CAR.

== Early life ==
Agboyibo was born Kouvé, Yoto Prefecture, in 1943. His parents were Soklou Agboyibo and Doafio.

== Career ==
He became a lawyer and was active as an advocate for human rights. In the March 1985 parliamentary election, which was held during the single-party rule of the Rally of the Togolese People (RPT), he was elected to the National Assembly as an independent, winning the seat for Yoto Est constituency with 82.63% of the vote.

In 1987, President Gnassingbé Eyadéma appointed Agboyibo as President of the National Commission for Human Rights, which was created by the government on 9 June 1987 and inaugurated on 21 October 1987. He served in that position until 1990.

Agboyibo was re-elected to the National Assembly in 1990, serving as a Deputy until the National Assembly was dissolved in 1991. He was also a member of the Togolese League of Human Rights and was President of the Committee of Action against Tribalism and Regionalism from December 1990 to 1991.

=== Action Committee for Renewal ===
Agboyibo was a leading participant in the struggle for democracy in the early 1990s and was President of the Front of Associations for Revival (FAR) at that time. He participated in the July–August 1991 National Conference and was subsequently a member of the High Council of the Republic, which acted as the transitional legislature, from 1991 to 1992. He also transformed the FAR into the Action Committee for Renewal (CAR), a political party, in 1991. He was a member of the Vatican's Pontifical Council for Justice and Peace from 1990 to 1995, and on 12 May 1993 he was awarded the first German Africa Prize.

Although Agboyibo was initially a candidate in the August 1993 presidential election, he announced that he was withdrawing his candidacy and boycotting the election, along with fellow opposition candidate Edem Kodjo, on 22 August. He and Kodjo withdrew due to concerns about fraud, believing that the number of registered voters—which had sharply increased since 1992—was too high. In the absence of any serious opposition, incumbent President Eyadéma won the election overwhelmingly.

Agboyibo was elected to the National Assembly in the first round of the February 1994 parliamentary election as the CAR candidate in the First Constituency of Yoto-Centre. Following the election, the CAR and its ally, the Kodjo-led Togolese Union for Democracy (UTD), held a parliamentary majority, and they proposed Agboyibo as prime minister in March 1994. However, the elections for three opposition-held seats (two for the CAR and one for the UTD) were subsequently invalidated, narrowly depriving the alliance of its majority. Eyadéma appointed Kodjo as prime minister in April 1994; according to the CAR, Kodjo's acceptance of the post represented a violation of the two parties' agreement, and it refused to participate in Kodjo's government. Agboyibo served as President of the CAR Parliamentary Group during the 1994–1999 parliamentary term.

On 12 August 1997, when Agboyibo was leaving the residence of the United States' ambassador to Togo, his car was stolen and his driver was knocked unconscious in an assault in the Lomé neighborhood of Be-Gbenyedji. In November 1997, Agboyibo was assaulted in Bafilo before he was to address a meeting of the CAR. He said that his assailants were soldiers and that the authorities were responsible.

On 18 April 1998, Agboyibo was nominated by the CAR as its candidate for the June 1998 presidential election at a national convention of the party in Lomé, becoming the third declared candidate. On this occasion he said that the register of voters was seriously flawed and needed to be reviewed. On 18 June, he and fellow opposition candidate Zarifou Ayéva called for the election to be delayed due to irregularities during electoral preparations and difficulties they faced in campaigning, including their treatment by the High Audiovisual and Communication Authority. Following the election, held on 21 June, he denounced the declaration of Eyadéma's victory by the Interior Ministry as being based on "completely false figures" on 24 June and said that fellow opposition candidate Gilchrist Olympio of the Union of the Forces of Change (UFC) had actually won the election. According to final results from the Constitutional Court, Agboyibo received 9.54% of the vote, in third place behind Eyadéma and Olympio.

In 1999, Agboyibo was head of the CAR delegation to the Inter-Togolese Dialogue. On 10 January 2001, he called on Eyadéma to dissolve the National Assembly and hold a transparent early parliamentary election in March 2001, in order to fulfill a July 1999 agreement with the opposition. Later in 2001, Agboyibo was tried for defamation of Prime Minister Agbeyome Kodjo; he had allegedly defamed Kodjo in 1998 by saying that Kodjo had participated in organizing a militia group while he was director of the Lomé port. On 3 August 2001, Agboyibo was sentenced to six months in prison and was fined 100,000 CFA francs. On 23 August, the International Federation for Human Rights (FIDH) called for his release, saying that he had not received a fair trial and noting that the president of the court was also the ruling RPT's representative on the National Electoral Commission. On 27 September, he was additionally charged with having links to a group that allegedly committed crimes in Sedome in 1997. In late November, Amnesty International called for Agboyibo's release. Although an appeal court ruled in favor of Agboyibo regarding the defamation sentence in January 2002, he was not released due to the other charge of criminal complicity. He was finally released on Eyadéma's orders on 14 March 2002, a decision that Eyadéma's office attributed to "the interest of national reconciliation and political appeasement".

Agboyibo was the CAR's candidate in the presidential election of 1 June 2003, taking third place with 5.12% of the vote, according to official results. He claimed that fellow opposition candidate Emmanuel Bob-Akitani of the UFC won the election, placing Bob-Akitani's score at 54.80%, his own score at 13.46% (second place), and Eyadéma's score at only 11.03% (fourth place) in a statement on 4 June. Despite this claim, Eyadéma was officially declared the winner, and Agboyibo denounced the election as fraudulent.

Regionally, Agboyibo was President of the Union of African Parties for Democracy and Development from 1996 to 2004 and became Vice-President of the Union of African Parties for Democracy and Development – West Africa in 2005.

He was general coordinator of the opposition during the April 2005 presidential election; on 23 April, the day before the election, which was marked by violence and accusations of fraud, he denounced the election as "an electoral masquerade". On 22 April 2006 he was elected as the consensus choice for the position of President of the Bureau of the Inter-Togolese Dialogue, which ran from 21 April to 20 August 2006.

=== Prime minister ===
His appointment as prime minister was announced on 16 September 2006 and he formed a government, composed of 35 ministers, four days later.

In the October 2007 parliamentary election, Agboyibo ran as a CAR candidate in Yoto Prefecture, and he was one of four CAR candidates who won seats in the election.

Following the election, Agboyibo presented his resignation to President Faure Gnassingbé on 13 November 2007, saying that the election marked the end of the mission he had been assigned. It was speculated that he would be reappointed as prime minister by Gnassingbé, but on 3 December Komlan Mally of the RPT was appointed as prime minister. Agboyibo was succeeded by Mally at a ceremony on 6 December, in which he spoke of his sadness in leaving office. Agboyibo chose not to sit in the National Assembly, leaving his seat to a substitute.

=== Later career ===
The CAR held an ordinary congress in October 2008, and at the congress Agboyibo chose to step down as the President of the CAR; he was replaced by Dodji Apévon. It is unusual for party leaders to step down in Togo, and according to Apévon, Agboyibo's decision was "a lesson in humility and democracy that Mr. Agboyibo wanted to impose on the political class". Agboyibo was, however, chosen as the party's candidate for the 2010 presidential election, and he was designated as the Honorary President of the CAR.

On 15 January 2010, Agboyibo was formally invested as the CAR's candidate for the 2010 presidential election. Amidst the election events, Agboyibo dedicated a book, Political and Social Governance in Africa, 20 Years After the La Baule Summit: the Case of Togo (Gouvernance politique et sociale en Afrique, 20 ans après le sommet de la Baule, le cas du Togo) on 20 February 2010. In the book, he criticized Togolese politicians for putting their own profit ahead of the interests of the people; he also emphasized the importance of dialogue and argued that meaningful opposition should not be defined by a refusal to participate in dialogue with the government.

In the presidential election, held on 4 March 2010, Agboyibo placed third, with 2.96% of the vote, according to official results. He placed far behind the top two candidates, President Gnassingbé and fellow opposition leader Jean-Pierre Fabre.

== Death ==
He died in France at the age of 76 years on Saturday 30 May 2020 following a short illness.

Political offices
Preceded by Edem Kodjo	Prime Minister of Togo; 2006–2007	Succeeded by Komlan Mally
