= Gahoun Georges Hégbor =

Togolese politician (born 1940)

Gahoun Kossi Georges Hégbor (born August 18, 1940) is a Togolese politician who co-founded the Action Committee for Renewal (CAR) political party.

== Early life and education ==
Hégbor was born in Baguida in 1940. In 1965, he received a technical certificate in journalism in Paris. Later on, Hégbor earned a law degree (DESS) at Panthéon-Assas University in 1975 and was admitted to the bar in 1978.

== Career ==
Hégbor worked as a journalist for Togo-Presse from 1963 to 1972 and was a diplomat at the Togolese embassy in Paris from 1972 to 1976.

Hégbor was a founding member of the Action Committee for Renewal (CAR). On June 23, 1993, he filed the candidacy of CAR President Yawovi Agboyibo for the 1993 presidential election. He was elected to the National Assembly in the second round of the February 1994 parliamentary election as the CAR candidate in the Second Constituency of Golfe Prefecture.

Hégbor was the speaker for the demonstrators that organized an August 2001 protest against the arrest of Agboyibo.

At the 2006 Inter-Togolese Dialogue, Hégbor signed the Global Political Accord on the electoral process on behalf of the CAR on August 20, 2006. On September 20, 2006, Hégbor was appointed to the government of Prime Minister Agboyibo as Minister of Communication and Civic Education. At the time of his appointment, Hégbor was the First Vice-President of the CAR.

In the October 2007 parliamentary election, Hégbor was the first candidate on the CAR's candidate list for Lomé, but he did not win a seat in the election.
