= Socialist Pact for Renewal =

Political party in Togo

- Founded: 1990s or 2000s
- Ideology: Socialism

The Socialist Pact for Renewal (Pacte Socialiste pour le Renouveau) is a political party in Togo.

The PSR did not take part in the parliamentary election held on 27 October 2002; as part of the Coalition of Democratic Forces, it called for a boycott. Dahuku Pere, a former President of the National Assembly and leading member of the ruling Rally of the Togolese People (RPT) who went into opposition in 2002, ran as the PSR's candidate in the June 2003 presidential election. The PSR supported Emmanuel Bob-Akitani of the Union of Forces for Change in the presidential election of 24 April 2005, in which Bob-Akitani officially placed second with 38.1% of the vote.

In June 2005, the PSR joined the government, the only member of the radical opposition to do so; PSR President Abi Tchessa became Minister of Justice. In September 2006, he was moved to the post of Minister in charge of Relations with the Institutions of the Republic.

The party participated in the October 2007 parliamentary election, but did not win any seats in the National Assembly.
