= 2007 Togolese parliamentary election =

- 14 October 2007
- All 81 seats in the National Assembly; 41 seats needed for a majority
- Turnout: 85.14% (▲17.71pp)
Party	Leader	Vote %	Seats	+/–
RPT	Faure Gnassingbé	40.19	50	−22
UFC	Gilchrist Olympio	37.79	27	New
CAR	Yawovi Agboyibo	8.39	4	New
This lists parties that won seats. See the complete results below.
Results by constituency
Prime Minister before	Prime Minister after
Yawovi Agboyibo; CAR	Komlan Mally; RPT

Parliamentary elections were held in Togo on October 14, 2007 for the 81 seats in the National Assembly. There were over 2,000 candidates, with 32 parties and 41 lists of independent candidates competing. The ruling Rally of the Togolese People (RPT) was victorious, winning a majority of 50 seats. The remaining seats were won by opposition parties; the Union of the Forces of Change (UFC) won 27 seats and the Action Committee for Renewal (CAR) won four seats. They were the first parliamentary elections since the beginning of multiparty politics in the early 1990s in which all major parties participated.

== Background ==
The 2007 elections were the first parliamentary elections to be held following the February 2005 death of long-time President Gnassingbé Eyadéma, who was succeeded by his son, Faure Gnassingbé, elected in April 2005. They followed an agreement between parties in August 2006 and the appointment of a government incorporating the opposition and headed by an opposition leader, Yawovi Agboyibo, in September 2006.

The elections were originally scheduled for June 24, 2007, but in May they were delayed until 5 August. On July 5, it was delayed again by the Independent National Electoral Commission (CENI), although no new date was announced at that time. This delay was caused by a delay in the holding of an electoral census, which was planned to be held from June 8 to July 9 but was rescheduled to run from July 16 to August 17. The census was scheduled to be conducted in one part of the country, called Zone A, from July 16 to July 29, and in another part, called Zone B, from August 4 to August 17; in the remaining part of the country, comprising Lomé and Golfe Prefecture, the census was scheduled to be conducted throughout the period. The end date for the census in Zone A was subsequently extended to August 1, and the census in Zone B was delayed until August 6, with the end date being extended until August 19.

Veteran opposition leader Gilchrist Olympio of the Union of the Forces of Change (UFC) arrived in Togo on August 18 and registered to vote. He said that CENI's work was "not too bad given the means at its disposal" and that the census was "encouraging"; he also urged people to register. The 2007 elections were the first parliamentary elections in which the UFC had participated since the beginning of multiparty politics in the early 1990s.

On August 23, Revival and Redemption Party (PRR) leader Nicolas Lawson called on the people to vote, describing the elections as a "decisive step forward" and saying that the country "must return to democratic principles, to survive and to develop". He was critical of independent candidates, who he said did not have political programs and would only increase confusion in a country that already had about 80 parties.

Following the census, CENI spent one month, beginning on August 30, eliminating fraud from the electoral list by searching for voters who registered more than once through a computer system comparing fingerprints. Voters who registered more than once were given until August 30 to come forward about this so that the electoral list could be corrected; they were warned that they would face prosecution if they did not do so.

On 20 September, nine new members of the Constitutional Court were sworn in; this followed the appointment of a new head of the Court, Aboudou Assouma, by Gnassingbé on 17 September.

In CENI's review of the electoral census, about 7,000 doubled names were found. The local independent electoral commission (CELI) for Lomé was dissolved by CENI for failing to respect its instructions with regard to multiple registration on September 23.s On September 29, a new Lomé CELI was installed by CENI President Tozim Potopéré.

== Electoral system ==
The 81 seats in the National Assembly were elected by proportional representation in several multi-member constituencies. Seats were allotted based on the system of highest averages.

== Campaign ==
On August 30, it was announced that National Assembly had been dissolved, that the elections would be held on October 14, and that campaigning would run from September 29 to October 12. On the same day, the 162 candidates of the UFC (including their substitutes) were invested by Olympio at a UFC extraordinary congress in Nyékonakpoe, a district of Lomé. The ruling Rally of the Togolese People (RPT) invested its 162 candidates (including substitutes) on September 7 at the Palace of Congresses in Lomé. These candidates included Minister of Defense Kpatcha Gnassingbé, Minister of Social Affairs and the Protection of Women Memounatou Ibrahima, Minister of Labor, Employment and the Civil Service Katari Foli-Bazi, National Assembly President Abass Bonfoh, and National Assembly Vice-President Eric Kpadé.

The Socialist Pact for Renewal (PSR) invested its 130 candidates on September 8 in Atakpamé. Prime Minister Yawovi Agboyibo's party, the Committee of Action for Renewal (CAR), invested its 162 candidates on September 12 in Lomé; its candidates included Agboyibo, the party's president, Gahoun Georges Hégbor, CAR's vice-president and also Minister of Communication, and Ouro-Bossi Tchacondoh, who was Deputy Minister in charge of Local Communities. On the same day, the Democratic Alliance for the Fatherland (the Alliance), led by Dahuku Péré, invested its 104 candidates in Notsé. Its candidates stood in 19 prefectures, as well as Lomé. The Democratic Convention of the African People (CDPA), led by Minister of State for Mines and Energy Léopold Gnininvi, presented its 162 candidates on September 13 in Lomé; the candidates included Gnininvi, Minister of Higher Education and Research Messan Adimado Aduayom, and Deputy Minister of the Informal Sector Lydia Adanlété. Gnininvi praised CENI's "remarkable work" and said that the electoral census had ensured "a credible process".

The High Authority for Audiovisuals and Communication conducted a draw on September 27 to determine the sequence of campaign airtime for political parties in the media. The Coordination of New Forces, a minor political party led by Joseph Kokou Koffigoh, won the right to speak first on TVT.

== Conduct ==
Following an agreement on conditions signed by the European Union and the Togolese government on August 3, election observers from the European Union were scheduled to arrive on 16 August and continue to observe all election events from that point on. CENI said that over 800,000 voters had registered by August 2, halfway through the census.

EU observers began to deploy in Togo on September 18, beginning with 18 observers. These 18 "long-term" observers were subsequently joined by 62 "short-term" observers who arrived on October 6, including the head of the observer mission, Fiona Hall. On October 11, six Members of the European Parliament—Valdis Dombrovskis, Patrick Gaubert, Horst Posdorf, Marie-Arlette Carlotti, Neena Gill, and Johan Van Hecke—also arrived to play a part in the observation mission. European Union aid to Togo had been suspended since 1993, and the resumption of EU aid was said to depend on whether the 2007 elections were deemed "free and transparent". There were expected to be about 3,500 observers in total, both from Togo and abroad; aside from the EU, other organizations that intended to have observers in place included La Francophonie and the African Union.

The Economic Community of West African States (ECOWAS) deployed a team of 140 observers, both military and civilian, on 2 October 2007. In early October, a final total of 2,974,718 registered voters was announced by CENI. CENI also announced that there would be a total of 396 lists competing in the elections, including those for both parties and independents.

A point of dispute regarding the conduct of the elections was whether ballot papers should be authenticated by being signed by two polling stations officials as a measure to prevent fraud. The UFC was in favor of this, but the RPT and the CAR were not. On October 10, it was agreed to have the ballot papers stamped rather than signed.

On October 11, the army and security forces voted three days early so that they would be fully available to maintain peace and order on election day. Their votes were not to be counted until the general population voted on October 14. On election day, electoral observers noted that turnout appeared to be high. President Gnassingbé voted in Lomé, praising the electoral process and expressing his faith in it.

The UFC criticized what it said was the failure of some ballot papers to be properly stamped, which it described as intentional. According to CENI, ballot papers are valid even if they are not stamped. Claiming irregularities in the vote counting, the UFC issued a statement on October 16 urging the people "to be mobilized to save their victory".

Also on October 16, Louis Michel, the European Commissioner for Development & Humanitarian Aid, praised the elections for what he described as their calmness and high voter turnout and the "confidence and maturity of the Togolese people in the exercise of democracy". On the same day, the EU observer mission said the elections were marked by "satisfactory conditions" and high turnout, and the Economic Community of West African States (ECOWAS), which had 152 observers present, deemed the elections to be "free, fair and open". The African Union also gave a positive assessment of the elections on October 17, although it pointed to some areas for improvement, such as providing sufficient electoral material and the way proxy voting was used.

== Results ==
Late on October 17, CENI President Potopéré announced provisional results for most seats. These results showed the RPT with a majority of 49 out of 81 seats, the UFC with 21 seats, and the CAR with four seats, while the outcome for seven seats was still to be determined. Turnout was placed at 95%, with 2,820,845 out of 2,974,718 registered voters participating. On October 19, additional results gave the UFC two seats from Golfe Prefecture, leaving only five seats from Lomé to be declared.

On October 20, Olympio said that the UFC, which alleged that almost 40,000 of its supporters' votes were deliberately annulled during the vote counting and demanded a recount, would appeal to the Constitutional Court regarding the results. On October 21, CENI announced that it was not going to publish provisional results for Lomé due to problems and was submitting a report to the Constitutional Court. The problems included more than 300 of the 751 ballot boxes not being properly sealed, an inability to specify the polling stations from which some of the results came, and some polling stations' results being recorded multiple times.

On October 23, CENI, on an injunction from the Constitutional Court, released the provisional results for Lomé. These results showed the UFC winning four of the seats and the RPT winning one, leaving the RPT with a total of 50 seats and the UFC with a total of 27. According to the provisional results for Lomé, there were 378,002 voters and 10,619 invalid votes; the UFC won 256,363 votes and the RPT won 54,102. Across the country, provisional results showed the RPT winning 922,636 votes, the UFC winning 867,507 votes, and the CAR winning 192,218 votes.

Patrick Lawson, the third vice-president of the UFC, said on October 24 that the party might be willing to participate in a new national unity government, but only under certain "clearly defined" conditions.

On October 30, the Constitutional Court confirmed the results of the elections; 50 seats for the RPT, 27 for the UFC, and four for the CAR. It revised voter turnout downward to 85%, placing the number of voters at 2,526,049, with 2,344,108 valid votes and 181,941 invalid votes, and it rejected 20 appeals. The UFC disputed the Court's results, with its Secretary-General, Jean-Pierre Fabre, describing them on October 31 as "neither credible nor acceptable" and saying that they did not represent the voters' will, and he demanded that the Court "seriously examine" the appeals. Fabre also accused the Court of "abetting the power grab orchestrated by the RPT through the Independent National Electoral Commission". On the same day, RPT Secretary-General Solitoki Esso expressed the ruling party's willingness to work with anyone of goodwill. On November 1, President Gnassingbé called for the results to be respected by all and said that he hoped that politicians would work together "in a spirit of unity and reconciliation" for the sake of the nation.

Party	Votes	%	Seats	+/–
Rally of the Togolese People	922,636	40.19	50	–22
Union of Forces for Change	867,507	37.79	27	New
Action Committee for Renewal	192,618	8.39	4	New
Pan-African Patriotic Convergence	43,898	1.91	0	New
Democratic Convention of African Peoples	38,347	1.67	0	New
Party for Democracy and Renewal	24,260	1.06	0	New
Socialist Pact for Renewal	23,254	1.01	0	New
Alliance of Democrats for Integral Development	21,441	0.93	0	New
Democratic Alliance for the Fatherland	15,444	0.67	0	New
Pan-African Democratic Party	14,141	0.62	0	New
Citizens' Movement for Democracy and Development	12,741	0.56	0	New
Union for Democracy and Social Progress	8,362	0.36	0	–2
The Nest	8,269	0.36	0	New
Popular Union for the Republic	7,814	0.34	0	New
Togolese Alliance of Democrats	7,542	0.33	0	New
Party for Renewal and Redemption	5,211	0.23	0	New
Union of Socialist Democrats of Togo	4,229	0.18	0	New
Juvento	3,873	0.17	0	–2
New Popular Dynamic	3,536	0.15	0	New
Movement of Centrist Republicans	3,157	0.14	0	New
Coordination of New Forces	2,170	0.09	0	New
Believers' Movement for Equality and Peace	1,718	0.07	0	–1
Regrouping of the Live Forces of Youth for Change	1,550	0.07	0	New
Party of Action for Change in Togo	1,056	0.05	0	New
Youth and Dignity	710	0.03	0	New
Party of the Union for Renovation and Development	221	0.01	0	New
National Workers' Salvation Party	140	0.01	0	New
African Front for Democracy and Development	114	0.00	0	New
Independents	59,614	2.60	0	–1
Total	2,295,573	100.00	81	0
Valid votes	2,295,573	92.70		
Invalid/blank votes	180,836	7.30		
Total votes	2,476,409	100.00		
Registered voters/turnout	2,908,487	85.14		
Source: Election Passport

== Aftermath ==
Gnassingbé and Olympio met in Ouagadougou on November 2, along with President Blaise Compaoré of Burkina Faso, who acted as mediator. According to Compaoré, Gnassingbé said that he would invite the opposition to participate in the government. Olympio held out the possibility that the UFC would participate; Compaoré anticipated that the UFC would present conditions for its participation.

The new National Assembly opened on November 13. Its first meeting was chaired by the oldest deputy, Koffi Agbényéga Voule-Frititi of the RPT (age 73), along with the youngest deputy, Mawulikplim Moïse Sodahlon (age 32) of the UFC. Prime Minister Agboyibo presented his resignation to President Gnassingbé on the same day, saying that the elections marked the end of the mission he had been assigned.

Michel met with Gnassingbé in Lomé on November 17. Michel said that he thought "the conditions for the complete normalization of cooperation between the European Union and Togo are met" and that an official decision on the matter would be reached before the end of the year. Olympio met with Gnassingbé at the presidential palace in Lomé on November 21 to discuss the appointment of the next prime minister and government.

In the National Assembly, newly adopted rules of procedure allowed for a parliamentary group to be established with as few as four members, thereby enabling the creation of a CAR parliamentary group. Shortly afterward, on November 24, the National Assembly elected its bureau, composed of seven members, all from the RPT. Bonfoh Abbass was re-elected as the President of the National Assembly, while Komi Sélom Klassou was elected as its First Vice-President and Yao Patrice Kanekatoua was elected as its Second Vice-President. The UFC withdrew its candidates for the positions on the bureau after the RPT nominated a candidate for the position of First Vice-President, accusing the RPT of seeking absolute control of the National Assembly, and the CAR followed suit in withdrawing. The UFC and CAR criticized the RPT, saying that under the newly adopted rules of procedure a single parliamentary group should not hold two successive positions in the bureau, such as the Presidency and the First Vice-Presidency, and that the allocation of these positions, along with those of the bureaus of committees in the National Assembly, was supposed to reflect the composition of the National Assembly. The two parties said that it had been agreed that the RPT would hold the Presidency of the National Assembly while the UFC would hold the First Vice-Presidency and the CAR would hold the Second Vice-Presidency.

On November 29, it was announced that the EU was resuming full cooperation with Togo. On the same day, it was reported that the delay in nominating a new Prime Minister was due to continued attempts to get the UFC to join the government.

It was announced on December 3 that Komlan Mally of the ruling RPT, who was Minister of Town and City Planning in Agboyibo's government and had been elected to the National Assembly, had been nominated as Prime Minister. Following Mally's appointment, UFC Secretary-General Jean-Pierre Fabre said on December 4 that his party was "neither disappointed nor surprised" by the appointment of a Prime Minister from the RPT and that the appointment was in line with past actions by the ruling party which excluded the UFC, including the RPT's monopolization of posts in the bureau of the National Assembly. He also said that in his "personal opinion", the UFC had "no interest in participating in this government". Olympio described Mally as "some sort of civil servant, unknown to the public, unknown to the political class", and predicted that Mally's government would be short-lived due to the talks between Gnassingbé and the opposition.

Olympio also said that the election results did not properly represent the voters' will, pointing out that the UFC received nearly as many votes as the RPT, but that due to the way the electoral system was designed the UFC won far fewer seats. Relative to population density, a disproportionately high number of seats were allotted to the north, where the RPT's support was strongest.

The EU observer mission presented its final report on the elections to Gnassingbé on December 3. While confirming the mission's positive assessment of the elections, the report included a number of recommendations, one of which was that representation in the National Assembly should more closely correspond to population.

After the National Assembly opened, six deputies from the RPT (including Kanekatoua Yao, who had been elected Second Vice-President of the National Assembly) chose to resign their seats, along with three from the CAR, and were replaced by substitutes.

Mally's government, including 21 ministers and primarily composed of members of the RPT, was named on December 13. The UFC and CAR were not included in the government, although Léopold Gnininvi, the leader of the Democratic Convention of the African People, an opposition party that was not elected to the National Assembly, was included as Minister of State for Foreign Affairs.
