= Dahuku Péré =

Togolese politician (1953–2021)

Maurice Dahuku Péré (1953 – April 9, 2021) was a Togolese politician who was President of the National Assembly of Togo from 1994 to 1999. He was the national president of the Democratic Alliance for the Fatherland (the Alliance), an opposition party.

Péré was born in Bohou in Kozah Prefecture. After earning his degree, he was a teacher and then a school headmaster. In the mid-1980s, he studied school administration in Canada; he also studied English there and speaks the language fluently. He subsequently served as secretary-general of the Ministry of National Education from 1986 to 1990 and became head of the National Movement of Youth, the youth wing of the ruling Rally of the Togolese People (RPT), in 1987. He served in the government as Minister of Labor and the Civil Service from 1990 to 1991, and he was Deputy Secretary-General of the RPT from 1991 to 1994.

In the February 1994 parliamentary election, Péré was elected to the National Assembly from the third constituency of Kozah. He was then elected as the President of the National Assembly on June 23, 1994, receiving a majority of 42 votes, while 36 deputies abstained from the vote. He served as President of the National Assembly until 1999, and he was re-elected to the National Assembly in the March 1999 parliamentary election as the RPT candidate in the Second Constituency of Kozah Prefecture; he was the only candidate and received 100% of the vote. In November 2000, he was given the prestigious title of Commander of the Order of Mono.

On March 24, 2002, Péré, who was a member of the Political Bureau of the RPT, sent a letter to President Gnassingbé Eyadéma and the members of the RPT Central Committee in which he called for reforms in the party, saying that it was failing to achieve national reconciliation and economic development and that it was internally intolerant of criticism. Consequently, the RPT Central Committee voted unanimously on August 6, 2002 to expel Péré from the party, along with former Prime Minister Agbéyomé Kodjo, for high treason; he was also expelled from the Order of Mono on August 2.

Prior to his call for reform, Péré had been elected by the National Assembly as a member of the regional ECOWAS Parliament. At the ECOWAS Parliament, he was Chairman of the Committee on Law Regulations, Legal and Judicial Affairs, Human Rights and Free Movement of Persons. On August 27, 2002, the National Assembly voted to replace Péré with Solitoki Esso in the ECOWAS Parliament, with 62 votes in favor of his replacement and none opposed; Péré was the only deputy to abstain from the vote. However, the ECOWAS Parliament objected to the National Assembly's move, saying that there was no valid basis for Péré's unilateral replacement.

On October 5, 2002, Péré signed a joint statement with opposition parties on behalf of "reformers of the RPT". The RPT objected to this on the grounds that Péré had been expelled from the party and no longer had the right to use the party's name, promptly taking the matter to court and obtaining a ruling on October 10 that banned Péré from using the party's name or claiming to represent any group within the party. Péré's defense argued that he had never received a written notification of his expulsion from the RPT, as required by the RPT's constitution.

Péré announced on April 29, 2003 that he would run in the presidential election on June 1, 2003, as the candidate of the Socialist Pact for Renewal (PSR). In the election, he won 2.20% of the vote according to final official results, placing fourth; on June 2, the day after the election, he accused Eyadéma of ballot stuffing and claimed to have actually won 37.7% of the vote. In September 2005, he founded a new opposition party, the Democratic Alliance for the Fatherland (the Alliance), together with Agbéyomé Kodjo. Péré is the party's National President.

Péré was the first candidate on the Alliance's candidate list for Kozah constituency in the October 2007 parliamentary election, but the Alliance failed to win any seats in the election.

At the time of the March 2010 presidential election, Péré chose to support the main opposition candidate, Jean-Pierre Fabre of the Union of the Forces of Change (UFC), and the Alliance joined the Republican Front for the Alternance and Change (FRAC), a coalition backing Fabre. Some party members objected to Péré's decision, preferring to support President Faure Gnassingbe.
