= Eric Kpadé =

Togolese politician (born 1958)

Koffi Gbékandé Eric Kpadé (born 23 September 1958) is a Togolese politician of the ruling Rally of the Togolese People (RPT) who served in the National Assembly of Togo from 1999 to 2007.

Kpadé was born in Lomé. He was a customs inspector from 1992 to 1993 before serving as Prefect of Lacs Prefecture from 1993 to 1996 and as Prefect of Tchaoudjo Prefecture from 1996 to 1997. He was elected to the National Assembly in the March 1999 parliamentary election, as the RPT candidate in the Third Constituency of Lacs Prefecture, winning the seat with 65.25% of the vote. From May 1999 to October 2002, he was Vice-President of the Commission of Finance and Trade in the National Assembly; he was also appointed as a member of the National Commission for the Fight Against Corruption and Economic Sabotage on 14 September 2001. He was re-elected to the National Assembly in the October 2002 parliamentary election from the Third Constituency of Lacs Prefecture, and in December 2002 he was elected as the Second Vice-President of the National Assembly.

At the RPT's 9th Congress in December 2006, Kpadé was elected as a member of the RPT Central Committee from Lacs Prefecture. He was the first candidate on the RPT's candidate list for Lacs Prefecture in the October 2007 parliamentary election, but did not win a seat, as all three of the available seats in Lacs went to the opposition Union of the Forces of Change (UFC).
