= Jean-Pierre Fabre =

Togolese politician (born 1952)

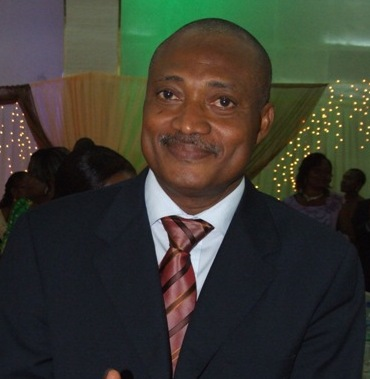
- Fabre in 2010

Personal details
- Born: 2 June 1952 (age 74) Lomé, Togoland
- Party: National Alliance for Change

Jean-Pierre Fabre (born 2 June 1952) is a Togolese politician and the President of Togo's main opposition party, the National Alliance for Change (Alliance Nationale pour le Changement, ANC).

He served for years as Secretary-General of the Union of the Forces of Change (UFC), and he was President of the UFC Parliamentary Group in the National Assembly from 2007 to 10 August 2010. He stood as the main opposition presidential candidate in 2010 and again in 2015.

When the UFC was founded in 1992, under Gilchrist Olympio, Fabre was designated as its Secretary-General. When Olympio was unable to run in 2010 election due to medical issues, Fabre was chosen as the UFC candidate for the March 2010 presidential election. According to official figures, he lost to President Faure Gnassingbe by a wide margin.

In May 2010, a power sharing agreement was signed by the ruling party and Olympio's party. Opponents of the deal and hardliners within the UFC, led by Jean-Pierre Fabre, left the party to create their own. A brand new party was created, the National Alliance for Change, with Fabre as president. In the 2013 legislative election, Fabre's ANC emerged as the main opposition party when its coalition (Sauvons le Togo) won 19 seats in the National Assembly. Fabre again ran as the main opposition candidate in the April 2015 presidential election and lost again to Gnassingbe. On 29 April 2015, Fabre rejected the official results of the election and proclaimed himself the elected president, alleging massive fraud by the ruling party.

== Education and early career ==
Born in Lomé in 1952, Fabre studied in Togo before attending university in Lille. After receiving a degree in economics, specializing in business administration, he returned to Togo in 1979. He taught at the University of Benin in Togo for four years and was secretary-general of an architecture and urbanism study group from 1981 to 1991.

== Political career ==
During the early 1990s, Fabre edited two weekly newspapers, La tribune des démocrates and Le temps des démocrates. He participated in the 1991 Sovereign National Conference and acted as spokesman for the conference. On 1 February 1992, Gilchrist Olympio founded the UFC as a federation of parties; Fabre was designated as the UFC's Secretary-General, while Olympio led the party as its president.

In late December 2002, when the National Assembly voted to remove presidential term limits and thereby allow President Gnassingbé Eyadéma to run for re-election, Fabre denounced the move and urged "the Togolese people to mobilize immediately to oppose this coup de force of President Eyadéma".

Ahead of the June 2003 presidential election, Fabre and another senior UFC official, Patrick Lawson, were arrested on 3 June 2003, apparently for inciting rebellion. They were released a day later, but only after being charged with involvement in a May 2003 incident in which a gas station was set ablaze.

President Eyadéma died in office in February 2005, precipitating an early presidential election. UFC candidate Emmanuel Bob-Akitani was officially defeated by Faure Gnassingbé, the candidate of the ruling Rally of the Togolese People (RPT), but the results were disputed by the opposition and serious violence followed. The UFC refused to participate in a government of national unity that was formed in June 2005, and Fabre said that the one UFC member who had joined the government was "only there in a personal capacity".

Having boycotted all previous parliamentary elections, the UFC participated in the October 2007 parliamentary election and Fabre headed the UFC list for Lomé. The UFC won 27 out of 81 seats in the election, confirming its status as the largest opposition party in Togo, although the RPT retained its parliamentary majority. In Lomé, the UFC won four out of five available seats, and therefore Fabre, as head of the UFC list, was elected to the National Assembly.

The UFC challenged the election results, but they were nevertheless confirmed by the Constitutional Court on 30 October 2007. Fabre then said that the Court had "refused to apply the law". Shortly thereafter, when the National Assembly began meeting for the new parliamentary term, Fabre became President of the UFC Parliamentary Group.

=== 2010 presidential election ===
It was long expected that Gilchrist Olympio would be the UFC candidate for the 2010 presidential election. However, when the deadline for filing candidacies was reached on 15 January 2010, it was Fabre, not Olympio, who was presented as the UFC candidate. Olympio was in the United States at the time, suffering from backache, and was unable to travel to Togo to undergo the necessary medical review for his candidacy. Consequently, the UFC submitted the candidacy of its Secretary-General, Jean-Pierre Fabre.

Reacting to the Constitutional Court's decision to validate his candidacy in early February, Fabre said that it was "unquestionably a message of hope for the Togolese people who aspire to a profound change". He also stressed that Olympio "embodies, more than any other, the ideals and values of our party" and that his own candidacy represented a commitment to continuing Olympio's work. Seeking to give the impression of solidarity amidst perceptions of internal disagreement, UFC First Vice-president Patrick Lawson said that the party was totally united behind Fabre's candidacy.

On 17 February, four minor opposition groups—ADDI, the Alliance, the Socialist Renewal Party (PSR), and SURSAUT—joined the UFC in backing Fabre's candidacy. Together they constituted an opposition coalition called the Republican Front for the Alternance and Change (FRAC). Although some opposition parties declined to support Fabre, preferring to run their own candidates, Fabre said in an interview on 17 February that the FRAC coalition represented a majority of the opposition's electorate. In reference to the other parties, he said that "it is up to them to join us", and he expressed some exasperation at their reluctance to rally behind him: "the ego is so strong in Togo that everyone thinks he can be President". He nevertheless said discussions would continue with the other parties and also insisted, in reaction to suggestions that the UFC was divided, that Olympio supported his candidacy.

Voting in Lomé on 4 March, Fabre said that "during the campaign, I went round the country and heard a distress call, a desire for change", and he warned the government to not rig the election in favor of President Gnassingbé, the RPT candidate: "The people will make sure their vote will not be changed." Fabre held a press conference on 5 March to declare victory, claiming that he had won about 75–80% of the vote; he also accused the RPT of electoral fraud and said that the results being sent to the electoral commission had no credibility.

The results were supposed to be transmitted to the electoral commission through the VSAT satellite system, but the electoral commission said that the VSAT machines had failed and that physical proof of the results would have to be delivered to Lomé. That method was unacceptable to the UFC, which said that results not transmitted through VSAT could not be trusted; it claimed that the machines had not failed but were simply switched off by the government.

Official provisional results were announced late on 6 March. They showed Gnassingbé winning the election with 60.9% of the vote (1,243,044 votes), far ahead of Fabre, who received 33.94% (692,584 votes). Significantly, the turnout varied greatly by region: it was 70–80% in the north—the RPT's stronghold—but far lower in the traditionally pro-UFC south (including Lomé).

Fabre alleged that the RPT had told his supporters that their fingerprints on the ballots could be traced and that they could therefore be hunted down and punished for their votes. He also repeated accusations of vote-buying and "massive" fraud. Declaring that he was "ready to die", Fabre led a group of UFC supporters in a protest on 7 March: "We're going to make them exhaust their stock of tear gas. We cannot let this go on, otherwise they'll hang on to power for the next 200 years." Although UFC supporters formed a protective cordon around Fabre, he was sprayed with tear gas and the protesters were forced to disperse, fleeing back to the UFC headquarters.

Reacting to the previous day's protests, the security forces formed a blockade around UFC headquarters on 8 March. Fabre, trying to reach his office, was initially barred from entry, but after an hour he was allowed through the blockade. The UFC announced that it would hold a large protest on 9 March to press for a review of the results; however, the protest was thwarted by the police. Also on 9 March, Fabre alleged that the security forces searched the UFC headquarters, seized computers, and arrested party members, interfering with the party's efforts to prepare evidence of fraud.

In an interview on 11 March, Gilbert Bawara, the Minister of Cooperation, criticized Fabre. He said that Fabre should not expect the Togolese people to trust him when he did not trust others, and he argued that Fabre's claims of victory were ridiculous, noting that Fabre initially claimed a score of 75–80% but later claimed a lesser figure of 55–60%. Bawara nevertheless acknowledged that Fabre had received a respectable number of votes; he observed that Fabre's score of 34% was particularly impressive because he had not been envisioned as a presidential candidate before January 2010. However, he also said that Fabre lacked experience and did not do serious work in the National Assembly.

=== 2015 presidential election ===
Fabre ran as the opposition coalition (CAP) candidate in the presidential election held on 25 April 2015 and lost again to the incumbent President Faure Gnassingbe, according to official results. On 29 April 2015, a day after election results were released by the national election commission, Fabre rejected the official results of the election and proclaimed himself the elected president, alleging massive fraud by the ruling party.

On 1 May 2015, Patrick Lawson-Banku, Fabre's communication director, released a statement to the press in which he claimed that Fabre had won 641.765 votes to 539.764 for Gnassingbé. These results, according to Lawson, accounted for about 60% of the polling centers. The remaining 40% of polling centers were largely from the northern part of the country, considered the incumbent's stronghold. Fabre's party claimed the results from the northern polling centers were fraudulent.
