= Koffi Agbényéga Voule-Frititi =

Togolese politician (born 1934)

Koffi Agbényéga Marcel Voule-frititi (born 10 July 1934) was a Togolese politician, who served as a deputy in the National Assembly of Togo. He was a member of the Rally of the Togolese People (RPT).

== Biography ==
Voule-Frititi was born in Danyi on 10 July 1934. From 1966 to 1978 he was Director of the National Institute of Scientific Research, and from 1977 to 1982 he served in the government as Minister of Culture, Youth and Sports. He was Technical Adviser to the Ministry of National Education and Scientific Research from 1982 to 1985.

Voule-Frititi was elected to the National Assembly in the March 1999 parliamentary election as the RPT candidate in the Second Constituency of Danyi Prefecture, receiving 76.46% of the vote. He was re-elected in the October 2002 parliamentary election from the Second Constituency of Danyi Prefecture, and he was again re-elected in the October 2007 parliamentary election as an RPT candidate from Danyi Constituency. Following the 2007 election, he chaired the first meeting of the new parliamentary term on 13 November 2007 due to his status as the oldest deputy, and he was assisted by the two youngest deputies, Mawulikplim Moïse Sodahlon and Kwami Manti. He became a member of the National Assembly's Socio-Cultural Development Committee.

Voule-Frititi was a member of the RPT Central Committee from Danyi Prefecture as of the party's Ninth Ordinary Congress in December 2006; he was also a member of the RPT College of Sages.
