= Democratic Convention of African Peoples =

Political party in Togo

- President: Léopold Gnininvi
- Founded: 1980s
- Headquarters: Lomé
- Ideology: Social democracy Democratic socialism
- International affiliation: Socialist International (Consultative)

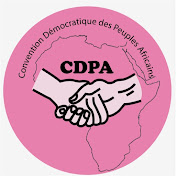
CDPA Togo logo Copyright CDPA TOGO

The Democratic Convention of African Peoples (French: Convention démocratique des peuples africains, CDPA) is a political party in Togo. It is a consultative member of Socialist International.

== History ==
The party was based in Ivory Coast until 1989 when it was forced to leave by President Félix Houphouët-Boigny. In the same year some of its members were arrested for handing out anti-government literature; when they were put on trial in 1990, large demonstrations in Lomé led to several deaths.

The CDPA boycotted the August 1993 presidential elections and the February 1994 parliamentary elections. Its Secretary-General, Léopold Gnininvi, was a candidate in the June 1998 presidential elections, but received less than 1% of the vote and taking fifth place. The CDPA did not take part in the 2002 parliamentary elections, as it was part of the Coalition of Democratic Forces, which called for a boycott. Gnininvi initially registered as the CDPA's candidate in the June 2003 presidential elections, but announced his withdrawal from the elections in late May, choosing to back the strongest opposition candidate, Emmanuel Bob-Akitani of the Union of Forces for Change (UFC), instead. The CPDA again supported Bob-Akitani in the 2005 presidential elections, in which he received 38.1% of the vote.

The party participated in the October 2007 parliamentary elections, but received just 1.7% of the vote and failed to win a seat. Gnininvi accepted the post of Minister of State for Foreign Affairs in the government formed after the election, and as a result he was criticized by much of the opposition, including some in the CDPA. Gandi Borouza, an important CDPA member, left the party in January 2008, arguing that participation in the government was harmful to the party's interests.

Prior to the 2013 parliamentary elections it joined the Rainbow Alliance, which received 11% of the vote, winning six of the 91 seats in the National Assembly.
