= Gnassingbé =

Gnassingbé is an African surname. Notable people with the surname include:

- Faure Gnassingbé (born 1966), President of Togo (2005–present)
- Kpatcha Gnassingbé (born 1970), Togolese politician
- Gnassingbé Eyadéma (1935–2005), President of Togo (1967–2005)

== See also ==
- Gnassingbé Eyadéma International Airport
