= Believers' Movement for Equality and Peace =

Political party in Togo

The Believers' Movement for Equality and Peace (French: Mouvement des croyants pour l'égalité et la paix, MOCEP) is a political party in Togo.

== History ==
In the 2002 parliamentary elections the party won one of the 81 seats in the National Assembly. It lost its seat in the 2007 parliamentary elections, when it received just 0.07% of the vote.
