= Action Committee for Renewal =

Political party in Togo

The Action Committee for Renewal (French: Comité d'Action pour le Renouveau, CAR) is an opposition political party in Togo. Dodji Apévon has led the party since 2008; previously it was led by Yawovi Agboyibo from 1991 to 2008.

== History ==
=== Inception ===
The Front of Associations for Renewal, which was led by Agboyibo, was transformed into the CAR in April 1991.

=== Parliamentary elections 1994 ===
In the February 1994 parliamentary election, the CAR initially won 36 seats, more than any other party, including the ruling Rally of the Togolese People (RPT), which won 35 seats. The CAR and its ally, the Togolese Union for Democracy (UTD), proposed Agboyibo as Prime Minister. However, results in three constituencies were subsequently invalidated, depriving the CAR of two seats and the UTD of one, and the two parties decided to boycott the National Assembly as a result. After UTD leader Edem Kodjo was named Prime Minister, the CAR chose not to participate in his government, saying that the UTD had violated the two parties' agreement; however, after the partial elections for the invalidated seats were delayed, the CAR decided to end its boycott of the National Assembly. It announced another boycott on November 7, 1994, over the issue of the partial elections, but eventually ended it again on August 22, 1995, after an agreement was reached with the government on the creation of an independent electoral commission. One deputy left the CAR in April 1996, and another in October 1996, reducing its number of seats to 32. The party boycotted a National Assembly vote concerning the Constitutional Court in December 1996, and another vote in September 1997 concerning the adoption of an electoral code; in the latter case, it did so to protest the withholding by the government of a report by a European Union mission about Togo's election process.

=== Parliamentary elections 1999 ===
The CAR boycotted the March 1999 parliamentary election and the October 2002 parliamentary election. Agboyibo was the party's candidate in the June 2003 presidential election, taking third place with 5.1% of the vote. The CAR supported Emmanuel Bob-Akitani of the Union of Forces for Change in the presidential election of 24 April 2005, in which he won 38.1% of the vote.

Agboyibo was appointed as Prime Minister of Togo in September 2006 at the head of a national unity government in preparation for a parliamentary election. In this election, which was held in October 2007, the party won four out of 81 seats; it won all three seats in Yoto Prefecture along with one seat in Vo Prefecture.

The CAR held an ordinary congress in October 2008, and at the congress Agboyibo chose to step down as the President of CAR; he was replaced by Dodji Apévon.
