= Hadja Mémounatou Ibrahima =

Speaker of the ECOWAS Parliament

Personal details
- Political party: Union for the Republic
- Occupation: politician

Hadja Mémounatou Ibrahima, also known as Mémounatou Ibrahima, is a Togolese politician, minister, and parliamentarian. Since 23 May 2024, she is the first female Speaker of the ECOWAS Parliament.

== Biography ==
During her political career, Ibrahima rose through the ranks of the Union for the Republic, the ruling party in Togo, eventually becoming its vice-president. She held various ministerial positions in the Togolese government, serving under both Gnassingbé Eyadéma and his son and successor, Faure Gnassingbé. The politician is described as a "lieutenant" of this dynasty. She served as the Minister of Social Action and National Solidarity in the second government of Gilbert Houngbo.

She was later appointed vice-president of the Togolese National Assembly. In 2015, she was elected to represent the Togolese National Assembly on the Higher Council of the Judiciary. In 2022, she led a delegation from the National Assembly to the Organisation of African, Caribbean and Pacific States (OACPS) in Strasbourg, France.

Ibrahima was subsequently elected to head the ECOWAS Parliament shortly after her re-election to the Togolese National Assembly on 23 May 2024. She is notably committed to combating youth emigration from ECOWAS member countries and is involved in efforts to restore democracy in the region's countries affected by military coups. With the help of the United Nations (UN), she also engages in initiatives to strengthen the role of women within the ruling elites of ECOWAS countries. Additionally, she raises awareness about the risks posed to the region by terrorism and extremism.
