= Union for Democracy and Social Progress (Togo) =

Political party in Togo

The Union for Democracy and Social Progress (French: Union pour la démocratie et le progrès social) is a political party in Togo. It is currently led by Gagou Kokou.

In the parliamentary election held on 27 October 2002, the party won 2 out of 81 seats.

The UDPS participated in the October 2007 parliamentary election, but did not win any seats in the National Assembly.
