= Kpatcha Gnassingbé =

Togolese politician

Minister of Defence
- In office 2005–2007
- Prime Minister: Koffi Sama

Personal details
- Born: 6 September 1970 (age 56)
- Party: UNIR
- Relations: Gnassingbé Eyadéma (father); Faure (half-brother)

Kpatcha Gnassingbé (born 6 September 1970) is a Togolese politician. He is a son of Gnassingbé Eyadéma, President of Togo from 1967 to 2005, and a brother of Faure Gnassingbé, who has been president since 2005. From 2005 to 2007, Kpatcha Gnassingbé was minister of defense. In April 2009, he was arrested on suspicion of plotting to overthrow his brother.

== Political career ==
Gnassingbé was born in Lomé, the capital; both of his parents were from northern Togo. During his father's presidency, he was closely associated with the military and worked as director-general of the Company for the Administration of the Free Zone (SAZOF) in Lomé. Upon his father's death in February 2005, his brother Faure assumed the presidency, and on 20 June 2005 Kpatcha was appointed to the government as minister of defense.

In the October 2007 parliamentary election, Gnassingbé was the first candidate on the candidate list of the Rally of the Togolese People (RPT) in Kozah Prefecture and won a seat in the National Assembly. However, he resigned from the National Assembly on 26 November 2007 due to incompatibility of functions, as he was still serving as minister of defense.

Gnassingbé was excluded from the government that was appointed on 13 December 2007, and subsequently, he sought to regain his parliamentary seat. He therefore resigned as director-general of SAZOF and as head of the board of directors of the Togolese Cotton Company (SOTOCO), and he informed the president of the National Assembly of his willingness to take his seat again on 12 February 2008; accordingly, the Constitutional Court restored him to his seat in a decision issued on 14 February 2008, as he no longer held any positions incompatible with the role of Deputy.

Kpatcha Gnassingbé was viewed as a hard-liner within the RPT regime, while his brother Faure was seen as having more reformist tendencies. He was a member of the RPT Political Bureau.

=== 2009 arrest and subsequent events ===
Kpatcha Gnassingbé's home was stormed by elite special forces on 12 April 2009, and two soldiers were reported killed in fighting there. The purpose of the assault was officially said to be the arrest of individuals allegedly involved in a plot "to undermine state security", and a number of arrests were reported. Soldiers returned to Gnassingbé's home on 14 April, although he was not present then. Gnassingbé sought asylum at the United States embassy in Lomé on 15 April, but the embassy refused to grant him asylum, and he was arrested at the scene by Togolese soldiers. According to state prosecutor Robert Bakai, there was "serious and corroborating evidence" indicating that Kpatcha Gnassingbé was behind a plot to overthrow his brother Faure. Bakai said on 17 April that the conditions of Gnassingbé's detention were "acceptable" and "humane". He also described Gnassingbé as "a respectable citizen who has served the nation".

The opposition Union of the Forces of Change (UFC) criticized the arrest, saying that Gnassingbé enjoyed parliamentary immunity. However, his case was legally treated as one of flagrante delicto; according to the constitution, deputies could be arrested and tried without formally lifting their immunity by a vote of the National Assembly only in cases of flagrante delicto.

Faure Gnassingbé, speaking on state television on 17 April 2009, alleged the existence of a coup plot, saying that the coup was supposed to occur while he was out of the country on a visit to China. He did not specifically mention Kpatcha in that address. Additional arrests followed in the subsequent weeks; those arrests reportedly included another brother, Essolizam Gnassingbé.

Citing Gnassingbé's parliamentary immunity, the UFC appealed to the Constitutional Court regarding Gnassingbé's arrest on 26 October 2009, but the court rejected the appeal on 4 November.

In an interview with the news agency Agence France-Presse in February 2010, Faure Gnassingbé stressed the importance of "building a lawful state" when discussing his brother's case: "We could settle it in the family, more simple, but it is a question of credibility. We cannot say on one side we are for reforms and on the other settle such cases surreptitiously, on the side."

In June 2021, a sick Kpatcha Gnassingbé asked to be released from prison. According to one of his lawyers, "a wound on his foot is getting worse" and Kpatcha Gnassingbé fears "amputation".

In March 2023, Kpatcha Gnassignbé was evacuated to Gabon to continue his medical treatments.
