= Union of Socialist Democrats of Togo =

Political party in Togo

- Founded: 2000s
- Ideology: Democratic socialism
- National Assembly: 0 / 91

The Union of Socialist Democrats of Togo (Union des Démocrates Socialistes du Togo) is a political party in Togo. The party participated in the October 2007 parliamentary election, but did not win any seats.
