= Gilchrist Olympio =

Togolese politician (born 1936)

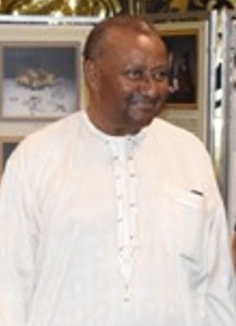
Olympio in 2017

Gilchrist Olympio (born 26 December 1936) is a Togolese politician who was a long-time opponent of the regime of Gnassingbé Eyadéma and was President of the Union of Forces for Change (UFC), Togo's main opposition party from the 1990s until 2013. Olympio is the son of Sylvanus Olympio, Togo's first President, who was assassinated in a 1963 coup.

== Early life, business career, and early political career ==
Olympio was born in Lomé to a wealthy, influential and aristocratic family of Ewe, Yoruba and Afro-Brazilian descent, the third of the five children of Sylvanus Olympio and his wife, Dina Olympio. His mother, Dina Olympio (nee Grunitzky), was a biracial woman of mixed Yoruba Togolese and German descent. Along with his two brothers, Bonito, the eldest and Elpidio the youngest, he did his secondary schooling at the prestigious Achimota School in Ghana, where their father sent them to ensure they became fluent English speakers. As well as two brothers Olympio has two sisters, Rosita and Sylvana. From Achimota school, he went on to study mathematics and philosophy at Hamilton College in the United States.

He furthered his education in the United Kingdom at the London School of Economics and then at Oxford University, where he earned a doctorate in Economics. He began his career at the United Nations in New York, working in fiscal and financial studies from 1963 to 1964 and then moving to work as an economist for the International Monetary Fund (IMF) from 1964 to 1970. He later returned to Africa, based mainly out of Ghana, to pursue a career in business.

Entering the Togolese political opposition, Olympio was sentenced to death twice in absentia by the regime of Gnassingbé Eyadéma. Accused of plotting a coup together with various others, a warrant for his arrest was issued on 13 July 1979, but he could not be imprisoned because he was not in Togo. There was no real evidence provided for these accusations by the Togolese regime and they were widely seen as politically motivated attempts to suppress the opposition movement.

== Political career: 1991–2009 and attempted assassination of 1992 ==
Olympio returned to Togo in July 1991 and participated in the Sovereign National Conference (Conférence Nationale Souveraine), which was held in July–August 1991. The conference put in place a new government and a transitional parliament.He founded the Union of Forces for Change (Union des forces pour le changement), a federation of parties, on 1 February 1992.

On 5 May 1992, while campaigning in Soudou in the north of Togo his convoy was ambushed by a group of gunmen. The first sign of an attack was when an explosive device went off ahead of the first vehicle in the convoy. During the attack, the gunmen sprayed Olympio's immobilised motorcade with bullets and 12 people, including Dr. Marc Atidepe, were shot and killed. Olympio himself was gravely injured being shot in the chest and hip. In spite of varying degrees of damage some of the cars, including his, managed to escape. He was rushed to neighbouring Benin where he first underwent an emergency surgery. He was then medically airlifted out to France with the help of then-Ivorian president Felix Houphouët-Boigny. He spent a year recovering from his gunshot wounds and associated complications in hospitals in France and the United Kingdom. Following the attack, Olympio lived in exile in Paris. An investigation by the International Federation of Human Rights (FIDH) found that Eyadéma's son Ernest Gnassingbé was in charge of the commandos who perpetrated the attack.

Prior to the August 1993 presidential election, Olympio rejected the choice of Edem Kodjo as the sole candidate of the Collective of Democratic Opposition (COD II), and on 23 July 1993, was designated as the UFC's presidential candidate. He was, however, disqualified from the election for non-compliance with medical certificates. He was a candidate in the disputed June 1998 presidential election, receiving 34.10% of the vote according to official results, in second place behind Eyadéma.

Olympio claimed to have won the 1998 election, however, and demanded that the election be held over again; he also wanted the March 1999 parliamentary election, which was boycotted by the opposition, to be held over again. He initially refused to attend the Inter-Togolese Dialogue held in Lomé in mid-1999 due to security concerns, but on 26 July 1999 he arrived in Lomé from Ghana to participate. Although the dialogue involved many political parties, Olympio demanded exclusive and direct talks between the UFC and Eyadéma's party, the Rally of the Togolese People (RPT), regarding the 1998 election. This did not happen, and other opposition parties complained that they would be marginalized by such talks between the UFC and the RPT. Olympio consequently returned to Ghana after spending only hours in Togo.

Under the terms of a 2002 constitutional amendment, all presidential candidates were required to have lived in Togo for at least one year prior to the election. This created a legal barrier to Olympio's candidacy in subsequent elections, since he had been living outside of Togo since 1992. In 2003, Olympio was deemed ineligible to run in the June 2003 presidential election by the electoral commission on the grounds that he did not have a certificate of residency and a recent receipt of tax payments. On 26 April 2003, Olympio returned to Togo, saying that he did not have any taxable income in Togo. Olympio appealed the electoral commission's decision to the Constitutional Court, but it ruled against him on 6 May. Emmanuel Bob-Akitani, the First Vice-President of the UFC, ran in place of Olympio; Eyadéma won the election.

After Eyadéma died in office in February 2005, Olympio said on 3 March 2005 that he had been chosen as the UFC candidate for the early presidential election that would be held as a result of Eyadéma's death. He was nevertheless barred from running, and Bob-Akitani again ran unsuccessfully as the UFC candidate in the April 2005 election.

Olympio campaigned across the country for the UFC in the October 2007 parliamentary election; his campaigning including a visit to Kara, Eyadéma's native area, on 9 October, which was considered unprecedented. On election day (14 October) he was reportedly exhausted and unable to vote for health reasons, leaving another to vote for him.

At the UFC's Second Ordinary Congress, Olympio was re-elected as National President of the UFC on 19 July 2008; he was also unanimously chosen as the party's candidate for the 2010 presidential election. Olympio said on this occasion that he accepted the "responsibility to lead the Togolese people to victory", and he denounced the RPT regime, saying that it had brought Togo to ruin through four decades of mismanagement and repression. He ultimately withdrew his candidacy, citing health reasons, and was replaced by Jean-Pierre Fabre as the UFC candidate.

== 2010 accord with the ruling party ==
In 2010, in the aftermath of the presidential election, while the FRAC leaders and activists demonstrated for several weeks to claim victory for Jean-Pierre Fabre, Gilchrist Olympio signed a political agreement for participation in a government of national recovery in a spirit of power sharing with the ruling party. This agreement, which granted seven ministerial portfolios to the UFC, caused an outcry among UFC activists, who considered it treachery. This unilateral decision taken without consultation with the national office of the party caused a severe crisis in the party. After an unsuccessful attempt by Fabre and allies to eject Olympio from UFC, the National Alliance for Change (ANC) led by Jean-Pierre Fabre and his companions was created in October 2010.

== Recent years ==
In the aftermath of 2013 legislative election, Fabre's ANC emerged as the main opposition party when its coalition (Sauvons le Togo) won 19 seats in the National Assembly. Olympio's UFC lost the electorate and won just three seats. Olympio remains President of the UFC but his standing in Togo's politics has become ambiguous, as he endorsed neither candidate in the 2015 presidential election.
