= The Nest (political party) =

Political party in Togo

The Nest (Le Nid) is a political party in Togo. The party participated in the October 2007 parliamentary election, but did not win any seats.
