= Socialist Revolution Party of Benin =

Socialist Revolutionary Party of Benin Parti de la Révolution Socialiste du Bénin
- Founder: Max Mensah Aithson (Togo); Théophile Béhanzin (Dahomey)
- Founded: 28 July 1959
- Split from: Juvento
- Headquarters: Cotonou
- Ideology: Communism; Marxism-Leninism
- Political position: Far-left

Socialist Revolution Party of Benin (French: Parti de la Révolution Socialiste du Bénin) was a Marxist-Leninist political party operating in Togo and Dahomey. It was founded in Cotonou on 28 July 1959. The party united Juvento dissidents from Togo and Dahomeyan trade unionists. The founding declaration of the party was signed by Max Mensah Aithson (Togo) and Théophile Béhanzin (Dahomey).
