= Togolese Alliance of Democrats =

Political party in Togo

The Togolese Alliance of Democrats (Alliance Togolaise des Démocrates) is a political party in Togo. The party participated in the October 2007 parliamentary election, but did not win any seats.
