= Regrouping of the Live Forces of Youth for Change =

Political party in Togo

The Regrouping of the Live Forces of Youth for Change (Regroupement des Forces Vives de la Jeunesse pour le Changement) is a political party in Togo. The party participated in the October 2007 parliamentary election, but did not win any seats.
