= Organisation to Build a United Togo =

Political party in Togo

The Organisation to Build a United Togo (French: Organisation pour bâtir dans l’union un Togo solidaire, OBUTS) is a political party in Togo.

== History ==
OBUTS was established by former Prime Minister Agbéyomé Kodjo in 2008. and Kodjo was its candidate for the 2010 presidential elections; he finished fourth in a field of seven candidates with less than 1% of the vote. The party joined the Save Togo Collective alliance prior to the 2013 parliamentary elections, with the alliance winning 19 of the 91 seats.
