= Party of the Union for Renovation and Development =

Political party in Togo

The Party of the Union for Renovation and Development (Parti d'Union pour la Rénovation et le Développement) is a political party in Togo. The party participated in the October 2007 parliamentary election, but did not win any seats.
