= Popular Union for the Republic =

Political party in Togo

The Popular Union for the Republic (Union Populaire pour la République) is a political party in Togo. The party participated in the October 2007 parliamentary election, but did not win any seats.
