= New Popular Dynamic =

Political party in Togo

The New Popular Dynamic (Nouvelle Dynamique Populaire) is a political party in Togo. The party participated in the October 2007 parliamentary election, but did not win any seats.
