= Nicolas Lawson =

Togolese politician (born 1953)

Jean Nicolas Messan Lawson (born 11 March 1953) is a Togolese politician and businessman.

== Biography ==
Lawson was born in Aného, Lacs Prefecture. He studied hotel management in Ireland and economics in France. After working as an executive for a number of French companies, he established a network of businesses in West Africa, including food processing in Côte d'Ivoire, pharmaceuticals manufacturing in Ghana, and newspaper publishing in Togo.

As Togo transitioned from one-party rule to a multiparty system, Lawson took part in the Sovereign National Conference of July and August 1991 as a member of the Association for Social Faith and Freedom, and he was a member of the High Council of the Republic, which acted as the transitional parliament following the National Conference. He was also Special Advisor on Political Affairs to Prime Minister Joseph Kokou Koffigoh during the transitional period.

Lawson, running as an independent, was the first person to declare his candidacy for the June 2003 presidential election. In order to stand in the election, he renounced his French citizenship. In the election, he won 0.20% of the vote, placing sixth. Lawson subsequently formed the Party for Renewal and Redemption (PRR).

Due to the death of President Gnassingbé Eyadéma on 5 February 2005, a presidential election was held on 24 April 2005. Lawson ran as the PRR candidate, but withdrew on 23 April after the interior minister called for a postponement of the poll. According to official results, he won 1% of the vote.

On August 23, Lawson called on the people to vote in the October 2007 parliamentary election, describing the election as a "decisive step forward" and saying that the country "must return to democratic principles, to survive and to develop". He was critical of independent candidates, who he said did not have political programs and would only increase confusion in a country that already had about 80 parties. Lawson was the first candidate on the PRR's candidate list in Lomé in the 2007 election, but the party did not win any seats.
