= Nyékonakpoé =

Neighborhood in Togo

Coordinates: 6°44′N 0°41′E

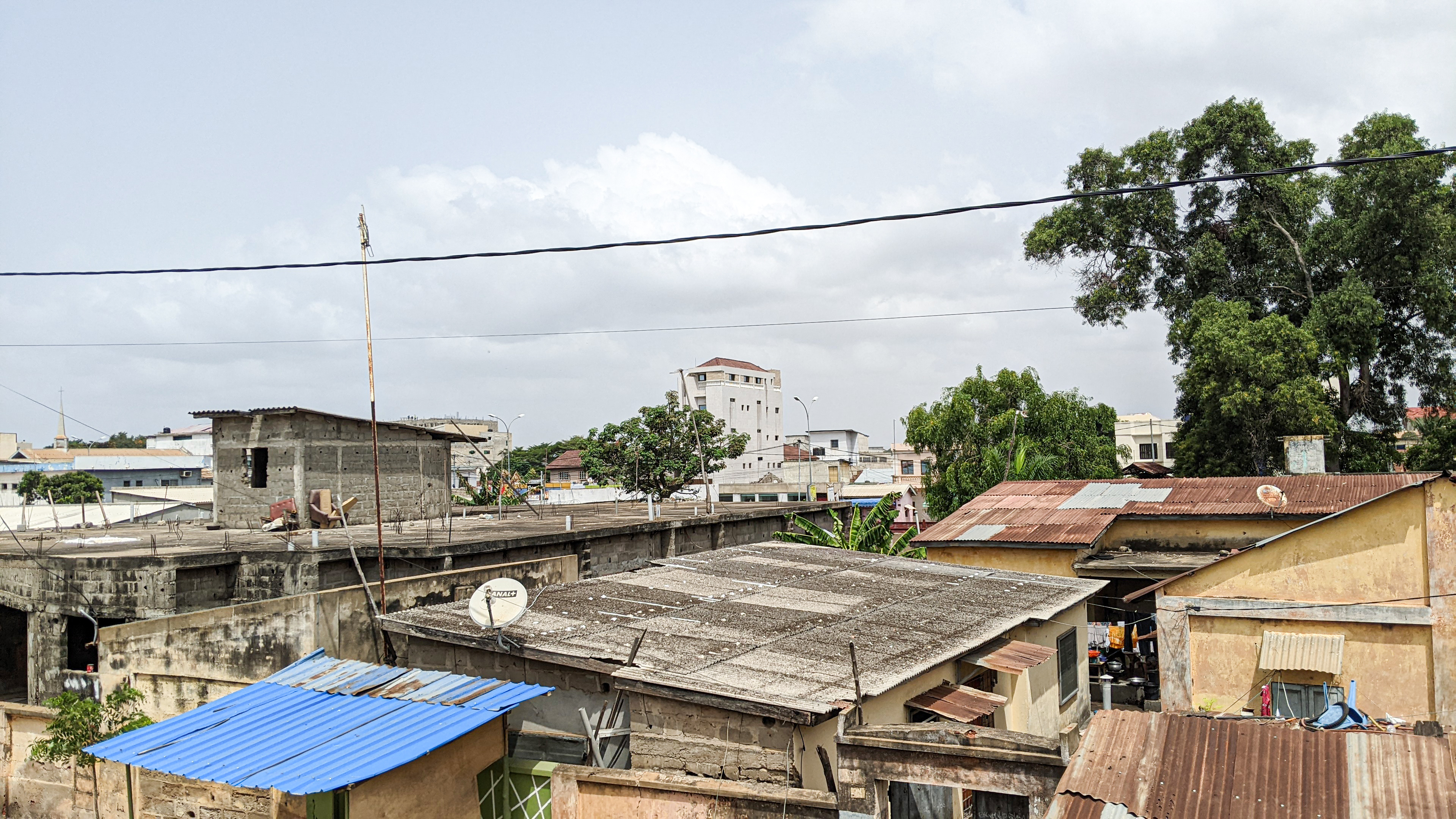
View of Nyekonakpoe

Nyékonakpoé is a neighborhood of Lomé, Togo.
