= Party of Action for Change in Togo =

Political party in Togo

The Party of Action for Change in Togo (Parti d’Action pour le Changement au Togo) is a political party in Togo.
