= Party for Renewal and Redemption =

Political party in Togo

The Party for Renewal and Redemption (French: Parti pour le Renouveau et la Rédemption) is a political party in Togo. At the last presidential of 24 April 2005, its candidate Nicolas Lawson won 1.04% of the vote.

The party participated in the October 2007 parliamentary election, but did not win any seats in the National Assembly.
