= Golfe Prefecture =

Coordinates: 6°08′N 1°12′E

- Prefecture
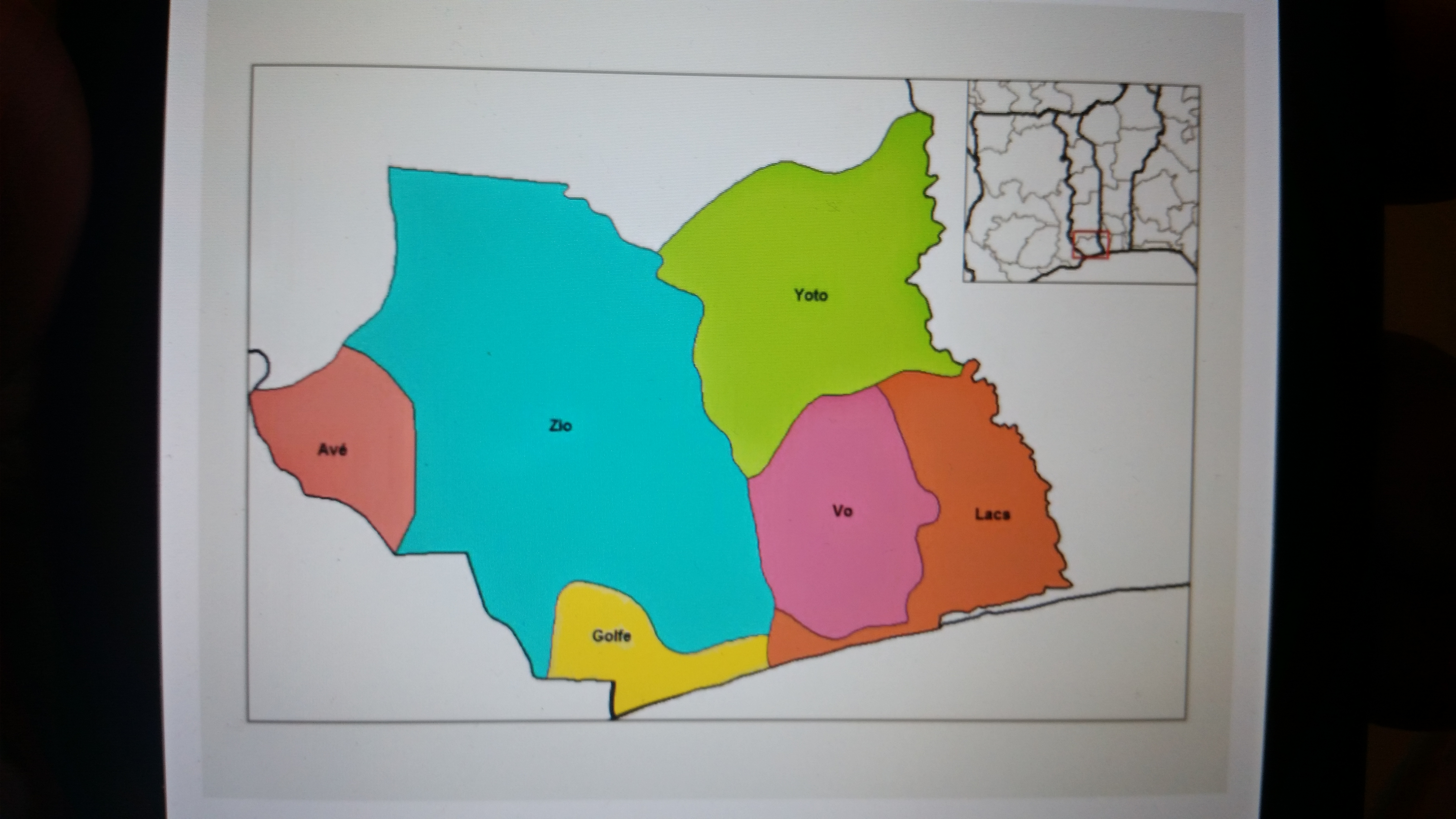
- Maritime Prefectures Showing Golfe (in yellow).
- Country: Togo
- Region: Maritime
- Capital: Lomé

Area
  - Total: 300 km^{2} (120 sq mi)

Population (2022 census)
  - Total: 1,305,681
  - Density: 4,400/km^{2} (11,000/sq mi)

Golfe is a prefecture located in the Maritime Region of Togo. The prefecture's seat is Lomé which is also the administrative capital of the Togolese Republic.

Cantons within Golfe include: Amoutivé, Bè, Baguida, Agoè-Nyivé, Sanguéra, Togblékopé, Aflao-Gakli, Aflao-Sagbado, Légbassito, and Vakpossito

== Administrative division ==
=== Golfe 1 ===
The municipality of Golfe 1 extends on 60,66km² and counts 496 870 inhabitants. It includes 31 districts:

- Hedje
- Bè Apeyeyeme
- Bè Dangbuife
- Bè adzrometsi
- Bè Agodo
- Bè Agodagan
- Bè allaglo
- Bè ahligo
- Bè hounveme
- Bè adanlekponsi
- Bè-wetekome
- Bè-akodessewa
- Bè kotokou kondji
- Bè Abloganme
- Bè-kanyi kopé
- Bè Adakpame
- Bè Adakpame Dangbuife
- Bè Adakpame Apeyeyeme
- Bè Adakpame kpota kolas
- Bè-kpota adidome
- Bè-akodessewa kpota
- Bè akossewa kponou
- Bè kpota- tokoin nutifafa kome nord
- Bè Attiegou
- Bè Souza netsime n°1
- Bé Souza netsime n°2
- Bè Souza netsime n°3
- Bè Antony netsime
- Katanga
- Kelegougan
- Klobateme

=== Golfe 2 ===
The municipality Golfe 2 includes 8 districts :

- Tokoin-wuiti
- Tokoin-tame
- Tokoin Enyonam
- Hedzranawoe n°1
- Hedzranawoe n°2
- Tokoin Aviation
- kegue
- Attiegou

=== Golfe 3 ===
The municipality Golfe 3 includes 8 districts :

- Tokoin Elavanyo lycée
- Tokoin gbonvie
- Doumassesse
- Tokoin klemé
- Tokoin Elavanyo atchnti
- Kelegouvi
- Massouhouin
- Hanoukope Est

=== Golfe 4 ===
The municipality Golfe 4 includes 26 districts :

- Amoutieve
- Bassadji
- Nutifafa kome sud
- Doulassame
- Lom-nava
- Hanoukope
- Adoboukome
- Aguiakome
- Anagokome
- Adawlato
- Beniglanto
- Biosse
- Assivito
- Sanguera
- Xlitivicondji
- Octaviano netsime
- Kodjoviakope
- Nyekonakpoe
- Adjololo
- Kodome
- Tokoin gbadago
- CHU sylvanus olympio
- Dogbeavu
- Above
- Bé klikanme
- Atikoume-Adjomayi

=== Golfe 5 ===
The municipality Golfe 5 includes 24 districts :

- Gakli Djidjole
- Tokoin Casablanca
- Akosombo tame
- Agbalepedogan
- Agbalepedo Dabla kopé
- Totsigan
- Totsivi Gblinkomegan
- Adidoadin soviepe
- Avenou batome
- Avedji Telessou
- Avedji anyigbe
- Adigome teshi
- Wossome Hetsavi
- Apedokoe legbanou
- Avedji kpodji
- Avedji awounogbe
- Avedji adidome
- Amadawome
- Adidogome
- Apedokoe moledji
- Avedji anyigbe sud
- Avenou kletsigome

=== Golfe 6 ===
The municipality Golfe 6 includes 11 districts :

- Gbetsogbe
- Nudokope
- Adamavo
- Logoti
- Doevi kopé
- Avepozo
- Devego
- Kpogan
- Boboloe
- Agodeke
- Baguida

=== Golfe 7 ===
The municipality Golfe 7 includes 26 districts :

- Akato-viepe
- Avoeme
- Akato-deme
- Segbegan
- segbe douane
- Kleme Agokpanou
- Kleme yewepe
- Wougome dekpo
- Wougome
- Agbado avoeme
- Sagbado logote
- Sagbado sakani
- Sagbado kpessoudji
- Lankouvi avoeme
- Lankouvi kpessoudji
- Lankouvi hodor
- yokoe kopegan
- Yokoe Agblegan
- Gblinkomegan
- Apedokoe gbomame
- Apedokoe Agokpanou
- Awatame
- Wonyome
- Agotime
- Zanvi
- Ablogome
