= Democratic Alliance for the Fatherland =

Political party in Togo

The Democratic Alliance for the Fatherland (French: Alliance Démocratique pour la Patrie, ADP), also known as simply L'Alliance, is a political party in Togo.

== History ==
The ADP was formed as an opposition party in September 2005 by former Prime Minister Agbéyomé Kodjo and former National Assembly President Dahuku Péré. the President of the Alliance is vacant.

The Alliance participated in the October 2007 parliamentary elections, nominating 104 candidates (including substitutes) in 19 prefectures, as well as Lomé. However, it received just 0.7% of the vote and failed to win a seat in the National Assembly.
