= 2003 Togolese presidential election =

- 1 June 2003
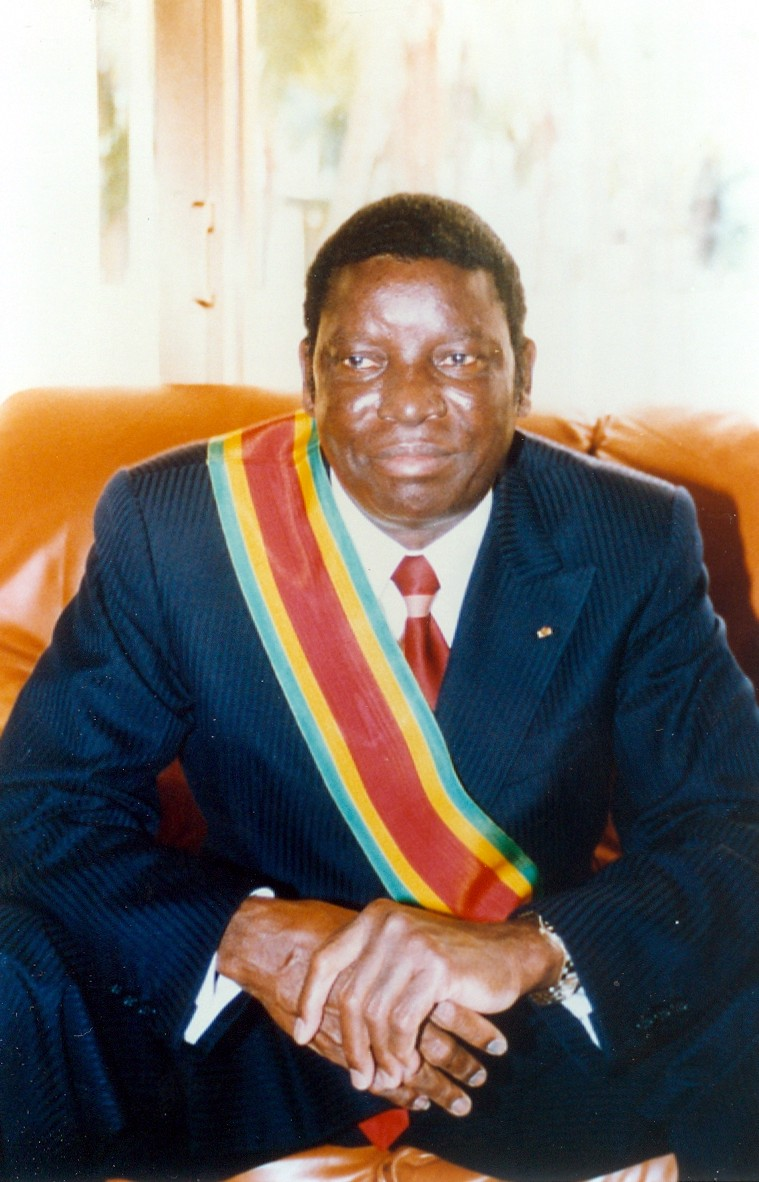

Nominee	Gnassingbé Eyadéma	Emmanuel Bob-Akitani	Yawovi Agboyibo
Party	RPT	UFC	ACR
Popular vote	1,345,159	784,102	119,372
Percentage	57.79%	33.69%	5.13%
- Results by region
President before election
Gnassingbé Eyadéma
RPT
Elected President
Gnassingbé Eyadéma
RPT

Presidential elections were held in Togo on 1 June 2003. The result was a victory for incumbent President Gnassingbé Eyadéma, who received 58% of the vote. The opposition Union of Forces for Change released their own results figures, claiming that Emmanuel Bob-Akitani had received 71% of the vote and Eyadéma just 10%.

== Results ==
Gnininvi withdrew his candidacy in May but remained on the ballot paper.

The official results were inconsistent, the total number of votes for candidates being 100 votes lower than the number of valid votes, and the total of valid and invalid votes (2,396,503) being higher than the figure for total votes cast (2,396,189).

Candidate	Party	Votes	%
Gnassingbé Eyadéma	Rally of the Togolese People	1,345,159	57.79
Emmanuel Bob-Akitani	Union of Forces for Change	784,102	33.69
Yawovi Agboyibo	Action Committee for Renewal	119,372	5.13
Dahuku Péré	Socialist Pact for Renewal	51,304	2.20
Edem Kodjo	Pan-African Patriotic Convergence	22,482	0.97
Nicolas Lawson	Independent	4,847	0.21
Léopold Gnininvi	Democratic Convention of African Peoples	409	0.02
Total		2,327,675	100.00
Valid votes		2,327,735	97.13
Invalid/blank votes		68,768	2.87
Total votes		2,396,189	–
Registered voters/turnout		3,223,353	74.34
Source: Journal Officiel
