= 2005 Togolese presidential election =

- 24 April 2005
- Registered: 3,599,306
- Turnout: 63.58%
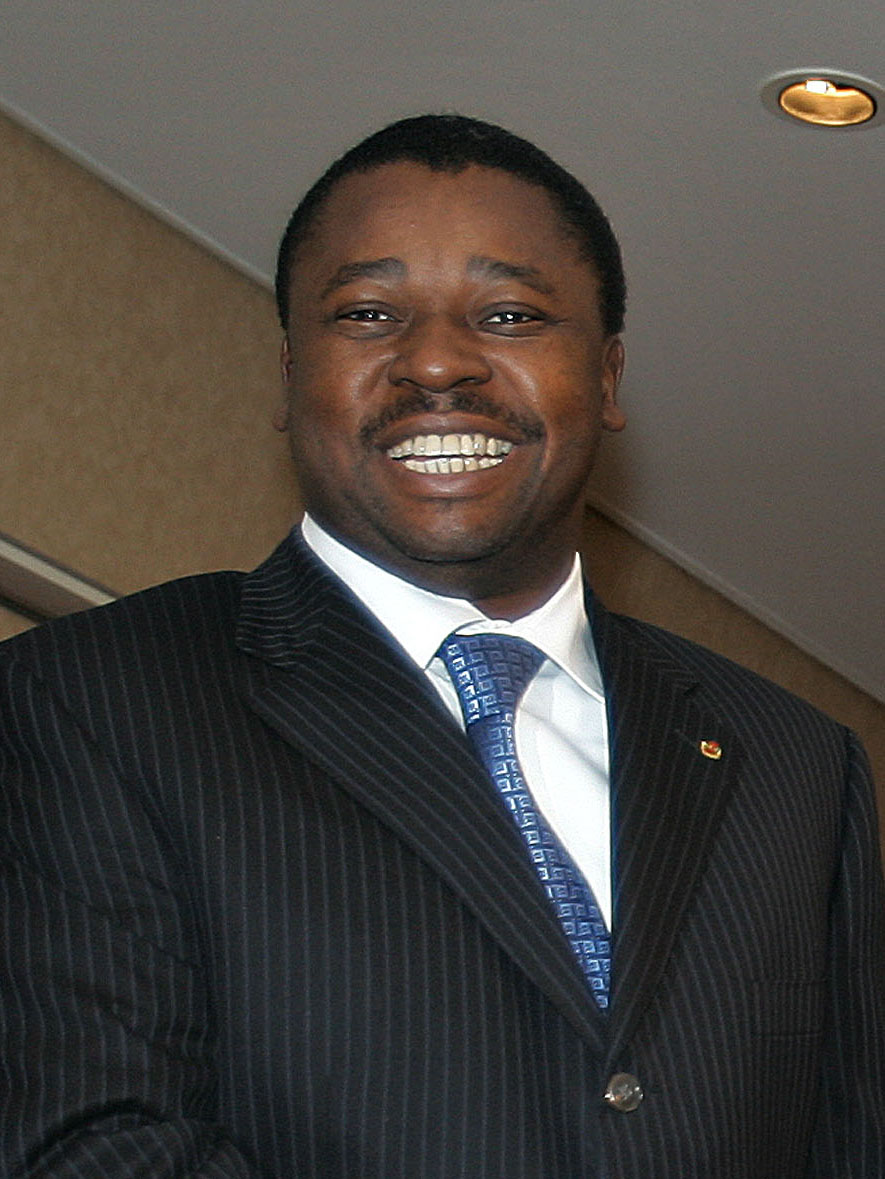

Nominee	Faure Gnassingbé	Emmanuel Bob-Akitani
Party	RPT	UFC
Popular vote	1,327,537	841,797
Percentage	60.22%	38.19%
President before election
Bonfoh Abass (acting)
RPT
Elected President
Faure Gnassingbé
RPT

Presidential elections were held in Togo on 24 April 2005, following the death in office of long-time president Gnassingbé Eyadéma. The main candidates were Eyadéma's son, Faure Gnassingbé, and opposition leader Emmanuel Bob-Akitani. The elections and the preceding period were marked by violence, with many people reported killed in various incidents. According to the official results, Gnassingbé won the election, taking slightly more than 60% of the vote. Violence flared in the capital Lomé after the results were announced, and thousands fled into neighboring countries.

== Background ==
The death of Eyadéma on 5 February 2005 was followed by the naming of his son, Faure, as president. This move was taken first by the military, ostensibly to ensure stability, and subsequently legalized—at least ostensibly—by Gnassingbé's election as President of the National Assembly by the National Assembly, which was controlled by the ruling Rally for the Togolese People (RPT). The National Assembly subsequently changed the constitution so that elections would not need to be held within 60 days, allowing Faure to serve out the remainder of his father's term, which would have expired in 2008. These events were branded an unconstitutional coup by many, who thought that the National Assembly president at the time of Eyadéma's death, Fambaré Ouattara Natchaba, should have taken power in accordance with the constitution. Under heavy pressure from other countries in the region, Gnassingbé stepped down on 25 February and was replaced by Bonfoh Abbass; elections were scheduled for April.

== Campaign ==
Faure was formally chosen as the party's candidate immediately prior to his resignation on 25 February. The main opposition leader, Gilchrist Olympio, was barred from standing due to a provision that a presidential candidate must have lived in the country for twelve months prior to the election; Olympio had been in exile, and his party, the Union of Forces for Change (UFC), nominated its vice-president Emmanuel Bob-Akitani as its candidate instead, representing a six-party opposition coalition. Bob-Akitani, who was chosen as the joint candidate of the six parties on 14 March, had previously run against Gnassingbé's father in the 2003 elections, receiving just over a third of the vote. Olympio returned to the country from exile on 19 March and endorsed Bob-Akitani's candidacy. Harry Olympio of the Rally for the Support of Democracy and Development (RSDD) said in mid-March that he would be a candidate; he pointed to Bob-Akitani's advanced age in saying that Togo needed youthful leadership. Gnassingbé, at age 38, was even younger than Harry Olympio, and also tried to use this to his advantage by stressing the need for youthful leadership. Another candidate, Kofi Yamgnane, withdrew from the race in favor of Bob-Akitani on 23 March.

Candidates had until 26 March to register, and campaigning took place from 8 to 22 April. The opposition demanded the postponement of the elections, and continued to do so after the Independent National Electoral Commission said on 23 March that the elections would go ahead as scheduled. Demonstrations both for and against the 24 April date were held on 26 March. Voter registration began on 28 March; complaining of irregularities in the registration process, on 29 March minor candidates Harry Olympio and Nicolas Lawson of the Party for Renewal and Redemption (PRR) also called for the election to be delayed by one month. Harry Olympio alleged that some opposition supporters were not being allowed to register, that voter cards issued for deceased individuals were being distributed and that people were being intimidated by the army, predicting "massive electoral fraud", and said that failure to postpone the election would result in a call for revolution.

On 16 April, seven people—six from the ruling party and one from the opposition—were reportedly killed in clashes between supporters of the two sides. Each side accused the other of provoking the violence.

A few days before the elections, Interior Minister Francois Boko said it would be "suicidal" to hold the elections as planned and called for it to be postponed. He also called for a transitional government to be set up that would last for one or two years with an opposition Prime Minister. This call was quickly rejected by interim president Bonfoh Abbass, who also said that Boko would be replaced as Interior Minister. Bob-Akitani, who also wanted the elections postponed, called Boko's action "courageous". Following Boko's statement, Lawson withdrew his candidacy.

On 25 April Gnassingbé and Gilchrist Olympio reportedly reached a deal providing for the establishment of a government of national unity, regardless of who won the election, but this was later denied by the opposition.

== Conduct ==
As the voting ended on 24 April, three people were reported to have been killed. Each side accused the other of disruption and stuffing ballot boxes.

== Results ==
On 26 April provisional results were announced; Gnassingbé had won with 60% of the vote, with Bob-Akitani coming in second with 38%. Harry Olympio received only 0.55% of the vote, while Lawson took 1.04% despite having withdrawn from the race. 64% of registered voters participated in the elections. The constitutional court confirmed Gnassingbé's win on 3 May, when official results were released.

Candidate	Party	Votes	%
Faure Gnassingbé	Rally of the Togolese People	1,327,537	60.22
Emmanuel Bob-Akitani	Union of Forces for Change	841,797	38.19
Nicolas Lawson	Party for Renewal and Redemption	22,980	1.04
Harry Olympio	Rally for the Support of Democracy and Development	12,033	0.55
Total		2,204,347	100.00
Valid votes		2,204,347	96.33
Invalid/blank votes		83,932	3.67
Total votes		2,288,279	100.00
Registered voters/turnout		3,599,306	63.58
Source: Psephos

== Aftermath ==
On 27 April eleven people were reported dead and 95 injured in clashes as supporters of the opposition battled the police in Lomé. Bob-Akitani subsequently declared himself President, claiming to have actually taken 70% of the vote. By 29 April approximately 100 people were reported to have been killed, many in the town of Aného, near the border with Benin. While Lomé was reported to be calmer than immediately after the election, armed men shot into the German cultural center before burning the building down on the evening of 28 April.

Gnassingbé was sworn in as president on 4 May. The Togolese League of Human Rights said later in May that 790 people had been killed and 4,345 had been hurt in the violence covering the period from 28 March to 5 May, a figure considerably higher than previous estimates of a death toll of about 100. An official commission of inquiry into the violence has been ordered by the government, the results of which are planned to be made public within three months. About 24,000 people are said to have fled into neighboring Ghana and Benin.
