= Union of Forces for Change =

Political party in Togo

Union of Forces for Change Union des Forces du Changement
- Abbreviation: UFC
- President: Jean-Pierre Fabre (since 2010); Gilchrist Olympio (1992–2010)
- Founded: 1 February 1992
- Headquarters: 59 Rue Koudadzé, Quartier Lom-Nava, Lomé
- Ideology: Social democracy
- Political position: Centre-left
- Colours: Yellow
- Senate: 1 / 41
- National Assembly: 0 / 113

Website
- www.ufctogo.com

The Union of Forces for Change (French: Union des Forces du Changement) is an opposition political party in Togo. The President of the UFC was Gilchrist Olympio and its Secretary-General was Jean-Pierre Fabre until 10 August 2010. Olympio is the son of the first President of Togo, Sylvanus Olympio, who was assassinated in a 1963 coup. On 10 August 2010, Jean-Pierre Fabre was elected as President of the party.

== History ==
The UFC was founded by Olympio as a federation of parties on 1 February 1992. Olympio was barred from standing in the August 1993 presidential election on a technicality. The UFC boycotted the February 1994 parliamentary election. Olympio was able to run in the June 1998 presidential election, placing second with 34% of the vote, behind long-time President Gnassingbé Eyadéma, according to official results; the UFC alleged fraud, however. The UFC boycotted the March 1999 parliamentary election, and it also participated in an opposition boycott of the next parliamentary election, held on 27 October 2002.

Emmanuel Bob-Akitani, the First Vice-president of the UFC, was the main opposition candidate in the June 2003 presidential election and the April 2005 presidential election, acting as a surrogate candidate for Olympio, who was banned from running because he had lived in exile for several years. He officially received 38.1% of the vote on the latter occasion, losing to Faure Gnassingbé, son of the deceased Eyadéma, amidst opposition claims of a rigged vote.

The UFC decided not to join the national unity government under Prime Minister Yawovi Agboyibo in September 2006, although many in the party were reportedly unhappy with Olympio's decision in this regard. The party's Second Vice-president, Amah Gnassingbé, accepted a post in the government as Minister of State and was suspended from the UFC as a result.

The party participated in the October 2007 parliamentary election, the first time it participated in a parliamentary election since multiparty elections began to be held in the early 1990s. The party won 27 out of 81 seats, behind the ruling Rally of the Togolese People (RPT), which won a majority. The UFC alleged irregularities in vote counting and, following the confirmation of the results by the Constitutional Court, UFC Secretary-General Jean-Pierre Fabré, described the results as "neither credible nor acceptable" and said that they did not represent the people's will.

At the UFC's Second Ordinary Congress, held in Nyékonakpoé, Lomé on 18–19 July 2008, Olympio was re-elected as National President of the UFC; he was also unanimously chosen as the party's candidate for the 2010 presidential election. Also at this congress, Jean-Pierre Fabré was re-elected as Secretary-General; Patrick Lawson was elected as First Vice-president, while Bob-Akitani was named Honorary President.

== Electoral history ==
=== Presidential elections ===
Election	Party candidate	Votes	%	Results
1998	Gilchrist Olympio	532,771	34.2%	Lost ✗
2003	Emmanuel Bob-Akitani	784,102	33.7%	Lost ✗
2005	Emmanuel Bob-Akitani	841,797	38.2%	Lost ✗
2010	Jean-Pierre Fabre	692,584	33.9%	Lost ✗

=== National Assembly elections ===
Election	Party leader	Votes	%	Seats	+/–	Position	Government
1994	Gilchrist Olympio	Boycotted		0 / 81	Steady		Extra-parliamentary
1999	Gilchrist Olympio	Boycotted		0 / 81	Steady		Extra-parliamentary
2002	Gilchrist Olympio	Boycotted		0 / 81	Steady		Extra-parliamentary
2007	Gilchrist Olympio	867,507	37.79%	27 / 81	▲27	▲2nd	Opposition
2013	Gilchrist Olympio	145,359	7.7%	3 / 67	▼24	▼4th	Opposition
2018	Gilchrist Olympio			7 / 91	▲4	▲2nd	Opposition
