= National Assembly (Togo) =

Lower house of Togo

National Assembly Assemblée nationale
- 1st Legislature of the Fifth Republic

Type
- Type: Lower house Unicameral (1960–2025)

History
- Founded: April 1960

Leadership
- President: Kodjo Adedze, UNIR since 14 June 2024

Structure
- Seats: 113
- Political groups: Government (108): UNIR (108); Opposition (5): ADDI (2); ANC (1); FDR (1); DMP (1)
- Length of term: 6 years

Elections
- Voting system: Party list proportional representation
- Last election: 29 April 2024

Meeting place
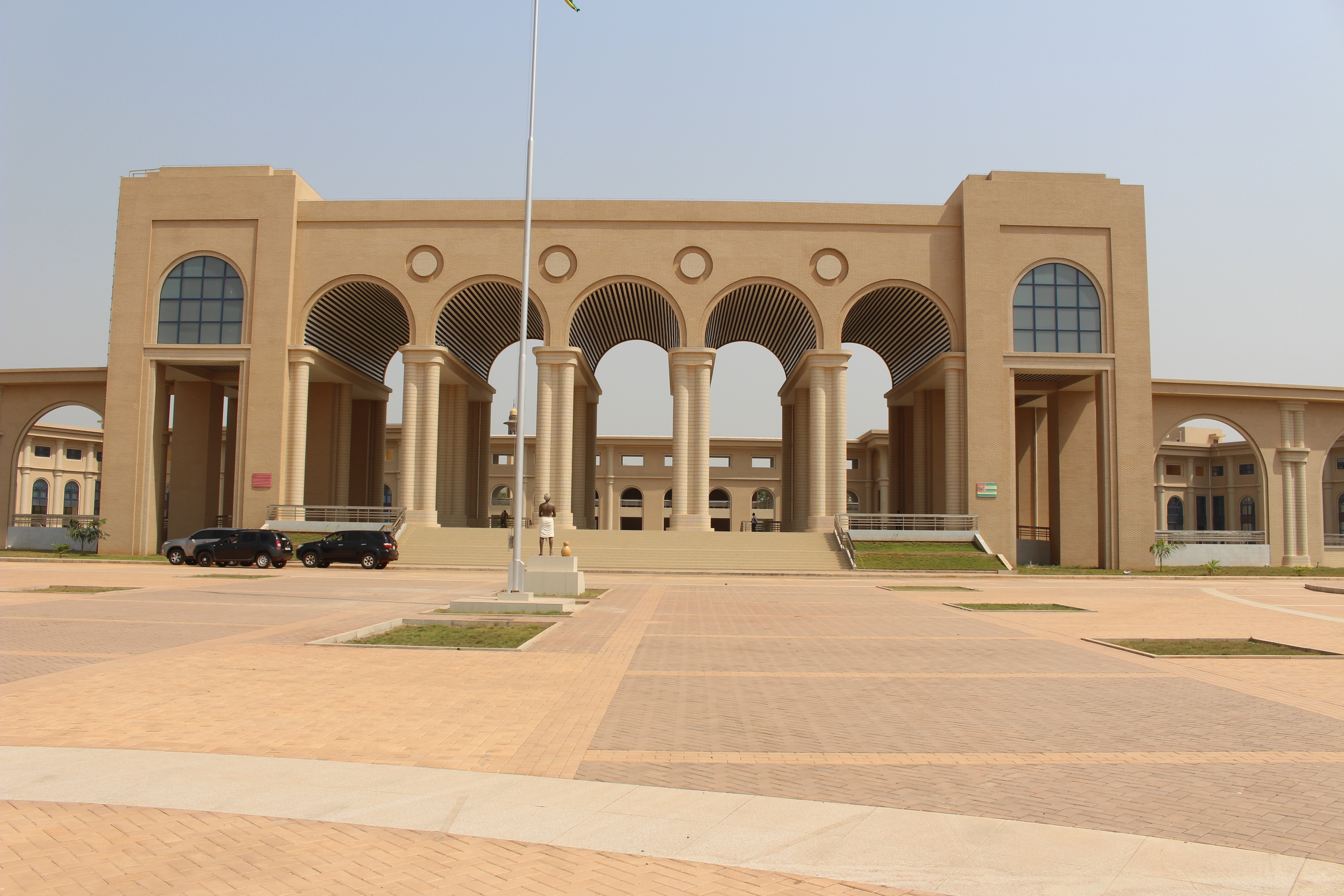
- National Assembly Building, Lomé

Website
- www.assemblee-nationale.tg

The National Assembly (French: Assemblée nationale, [asɑ̃ble nɑsjɔnal]) is the lower house of Togolese Parliament. It consists of 113 members who are elected for six-year terms in a party list proportional representation system.

== History ==
The National Assembly was preceded by the Council of Notables, and legislatures known as the Representative Assembly and the Territorial Assembly.

== See also ==
- List of presidents of the National Assembly of Togo
- Senate of Togo
- History of Togo
- Politics of Togo
- List of legislatures by country
- Legislative branch
