= 2012–2013 Togolese protests =

Political protests in Togo

The Togolese protests of 2012–2013 were mass uprisings against the long presidency of Faure Gnassingbé in Togo. Many were killed in the suppression of demonstrations. These protests coincided with the Arab Spring.

== Movement in 2012–2013 ==
In early June 2012, the Togolese parliament amended the country's electoral code. The opposition criticised these changes, saying they favoured the ruling party. Thousands of protesters gathered in Lomé on 12–14 June 2012, forcing the city's main market to close. Protesters threw stones and vandalized buildings, and police fired tear gas at them. At least 27 people, including policemen and protesters, were injured during the protests.

Hundreds of supporters of the Let's Save Togo campaign protested against the Togolese government on 5 July 2012 in front of the French embassy in Lomé. The police fired tear gas on the protesters again, forcing them to disperse. The opposition held protests on 21–23 August 2012. On the first day, protesters planned to march from Bé to the commercial area Deckon, an area the government prohibited protesters from entering. Togolese authorities fired tear gas on the protesters ten minutes after it started. According to Let's Save Togo, more than 100 people were injured, and more than 125 people were arrested during the rallies. Thousands of opposition supporters participated in peaceful protests on 24–25 August 2012.

Isabelle Ameganvi discussing the sex strike with a Voice of America journalist.

Thousands of people attended a Let's Save Togo rally in Lomé on 26 August 2012 which encouraged Togolese women to participate in a week-long sex strike to galvanize men ito participation in the opposition movement against Gnassingbé. Opposition leader Isabelle Ameganvi said this was inspired by the 2003 sex strike of Liberian women led by Ellen Johnson Sirleaf which pushed for peace during the Second Liberian Civil War against Charles Taylor. Protesters gathered in Bé on 28 August 2012 and prepared to march against the government. Before they could start marching, Togolese security forces fired tear gas on them. The opposition held organized sit-ins, and the security forces fired tear gas on them on 6 September 2012.

== Government response ==
In response to these protests, the government passed another electoral reform in September 2012. Opposition groups boycotted the talks because they believed the proposed term limits would allow Gnassingbé to potentially stay in office until at least 2025. On 15 September 2012, a mob armed with sticks and machetes entered an area where opposition supporters planned to protest. The mob prevented the opposition protest from proceeding and prevented journalists from taking photographs. Several ambassadors from Western countries expressed "deep concern" over the mob violence.

Thousands of women wearing red participated in a peaceful march organised by Let's Save Togo on 20 September 2012. The colour red was chosen to protest the precarious economic situation of women in Togo, as Togolese women traditionally made and sold red garments at the country's markets. Let's Save Togo held an opposition rally on 5 October 2012, the anniversary of the 1990 demonstration against Eyadéma. Security forces fired tear gas on them, injuring several people.

== Journalists protest ==
At an opposition protest in Lomé on 10 January 2013, several journalists were reportedly targeted during the protests, and at least four of them were injured. In late February 2013, three opposition supporters were charged with involvement in the fires that destroyed two Togolese markets in January 2013. On 12 March 2013, while Jean-Pierre Fabre was being questioned in Lomé, hundreds of his supporters tried to block the building's entrance. The police fired tear gas on them as the protesters threw stones.

On 14–17 March 2013, Togolese journalists held sit-ins to protest recently adopted media regulations which gave the government authority to shut down news outlets. On the first and last day of these protests, police fired tear gas and rubber bullets to disperse the crowd. Gnassingbé requested the amendments go through a constitutional review, and Togo's Constitutional Court declared them unconstitutional on 20 March 2013.

== Teachers strike ==
In April 2013, Togolese teachers went on strike to call for higher wages, and students protested in support of their teachers. The government temporarily closed its primary and secondary schools, citing property damage from the student protests. Two students were killed as a result of police efforts to disperse protests on 15 April in Dapaong. The government re-opened its schools on 22 April, though many teachers continued their strike and told their students to return home.

Étienne Yakanou, one of the opposition leaders detained in connection to the Lomé market fire, died on 10 May 2013. According to the government he died from malaria. The National Alliance for Change (ANC) accused the Togolese government of committing a "political assassination" by deliberately withholding treatment from Yakanou, and Amnesty International called for an investigation into his death. On 18 May 2013, a group of women from Let's Save Togo participated in topless protests inspired by the Ukrainian feminist organization FEMEN.

The opposition protests delayed the parliamentary election, which were originally scheduled for October 2012, to 25 July 2013. Gnassingbé's party won the majority of seats in the election, and the opposition declared that the results were fraudulent.

== See also ==
- 2017–2018 Togolese protests
- Protests against Faure Gnassingbe
