= 2024 Togolese parliamentary election =

- 29 April 2024
- All 113 seats in the National Assembly; 57 seats needed for a majority
- Turnout: 61.76% (▲2.51pp)
Party	Leader	Seats	+/–
UNIR	Faure Gnassingbé	108	+49
ADDI	Tchaboure Gogue	2	+2
ANC	Jean-Pierre Fabre	1	−6
DMP	Kafui Adjamagbo-Johnson	1	+1
FDR	Paul Dodji Apévon	1	+1
This lists parties that won seats. See the complete results below.
Prime Minister before	Prime Minister after
Victoire Tomegah Dogbé; UNIR	Victoire Tomegah Dogbé; UNIR

Parliamentary elections were held in Togo on 29 April 2024 to elect the 113 members of the National Assembly, alongside the first regional elections in the country. The ruling Union for the Republic won 108 of the 113 seats.

== Background ==
Togo's political life is dominated by the ruling Union for the Republic (UNIR), whose leader Faure Gnassingbé has been in power since the death of his father Gnassingbé Eyadéma in 2005. Faure Gnassingbé was initially interim president before being elected to the presidency later the same year, then re-elected in 2010 and 2015. This "dynastic democracy" is maintained from election to election through the repression of the opposition, election fraud and the modification of the constitution.

The previous parliamentary elections in 2018 were boycotted by the C14 Alliance, the main opposition group of fourteen parties, following irregularities in the preparation of the vote and the refusal of Gnassingbé to abandon his constitutional revision project. Gnassingbé had aimed to reinstate the limit on the number of presidential terms while "resetting it to zero", allowing him to remain in power beyond his third term, which ended in 2020. The 2018 parliamentary election campaign was marked by repression against demonstrators, and several deaths, including at least three by gunfire, were reported, leading the government to ban all marches or public gatherings in mid-December. In the absence of any real opponents, UNIR retained its absolute majority, winning 59 of the 91 seats. The parliament also saw a sharp increase in the number of independent deputies, with 18 winning seats. The Union of Forces for Change (UFC) and four other groups shared the remaining seats.

Despite the absolute majority obtained, the election result was initially considered a failure for UNIR as it failed to win the four-fifths majority of seats necessary for a constitutional amendment to be passed by parliamentary means alone. However, on 8 May 2019 the government passed a constitutional amendment almost unanimously, which allowed Gnassingbé to remain in office until 2030. Gnassingbé was unsurprisingly re-elected in the first round of the 2020 presidential elections with more than 70% of the vote, a result contested by the opposition which accused the government of electoral fraud. On 25 March the Constitutional Court validated 2,350 applications for 113 seats.

== Date ==
The election was initially supposed to be held on 13 April 2024 before being postponed by President Gnassingbé to 20 April, with campaigning to run from 4 to 18 April. On 3 April, Gnassingbé again ordered the indefinite postponement of the election to allow "consultations" over a controversial attempt at constitutional reform that would replace the presidential system with a parliamentary one, place executive powers in the office of the prime minister, and replace the direct election of the presidency with a vote by parliament. In response, four opposition parties and a civil society group called for protests to be held from 11 to 13 April and described the postponement as a maneuver by the regime to "endorse its own constitutional coup". On 9 April, the government announced that the election would be held on 29 April. It also banned a planned protest by opposition groups against the postponement and the constitutional amendments scheduled on 11 to 13 April.

== Electoral system ==
The 113 members of the National Assembly are elected by closed list proportional representation from 39 multi-member constituencies ranging in size from two to ten seats. Seats are allocated using the highest averages method. Nearly 4.2 million Togolese are registered to vote. Of the 2,348 candidates for the legislative elections, 593 of them are women, while 438 women are also running in regional elections. Campaigning began on 13 April and ran until 28 April.

== Observers ==
Foreign journalists were barred by Togolese authorities from covering the election. Thomas Dietrich, a French journalist who tried to cover the election was arrested, assaulted and expelled from the country. On 23 April, the Catholic Church's request to deploy observers during the vote was rejected by the Electoral Commission. ECOWAS said that it would send observers to monitor the election and deployed a “pre-election assessment” team. The African Union was also allowed to send an observer mission.

== Conduct ==
Voting at around 14,200 polling stations ran from 07:00 to 16:00 on 29 April, with provisional results expected by 5 May. Some voters reported that the process was disorganized, and some were unable to find their names on the register. The country's borders were closed, while 12,000 members of the security forces were deployed to safeguard the voting process. Concerns were raised over aspects of the election and turnout. An opposition spokesperson compared the lack of "real opposition" in the election to the political situation in North Korea. Turnout also varied per region, with areas of Lomé recording a minimum of 33% participation in voting while UNIR strongholds in the north of the country registered turnouts reaching 97%.

== Results ==
Provisional results showed by the Togolese electoral commission on 4 May showed that UNIR had won 108 of the 113 seats in parliament, while turnout was estimated at 61%. UNIR also won 137 out of 179 regional councillors in the regional elections held the same day. The results were validated by the Constitutional Court on 14 May.

Party	Votes	%	Seats	+/–
Union for the Republic			108	+49
Alliance of Democrats for Integral Development			2	+2
National Alliance for Change			1	–6
Dynamic for the Majority of the People			1	+1
Democratic Forces for the Republic			1	+1
Africa Togo Ecology			0	0
Emerging Leaders' Circle			0	0
Movement of Centrist Republicans			0	–1
New Togolese Commitment			0	–3
Pan-African Democratic Party			0	–1
Pan-African Patriotic Convergence			0	0
Party for Democracy and Renewal			0	0
Patriotic Movement for Democracy and Development			0	–2
Union of Nationalists for Work			0	0
Independents			0	–18
Total			113	+22
Valid votes	2,484,208	95.69		
Invalid/blank votes	112,004	4.31		
Total votes	2,596,212	100.00		
Registered voters/turnout	4,203,711	61.76		
Source: Journal Officiel
