= Protests against Faure Gnassingbé =

Political protests in Togo

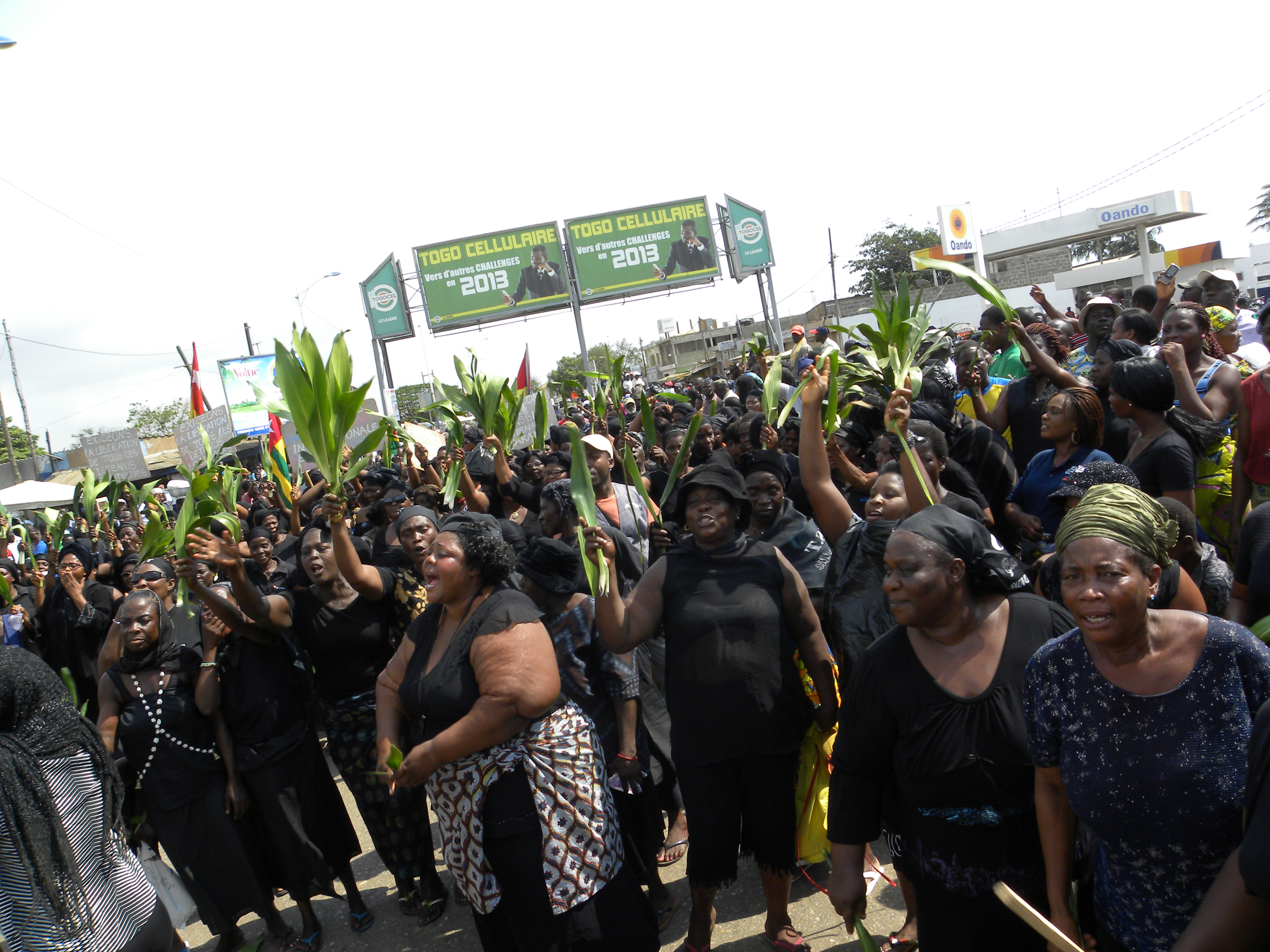
- Member of the National Alliance for Change protesting the government in 2013
- Date: 5 February 2005 – present
- Location: Togo
- Caused by: Authoritarianism; Electoral fraud; Censorship; Democratic backsliding; Economic inequality; Human rights abuses; Corruption; Rigged results of the 2005 Togolese presidential election; 2012 National Assembly electoral reforms; 2010 Togolese presidential election
- Methods: Demonstrations, riots, sex strike, barricading
- Status: Ongoing

Protests against President Faure Gnassingbé have occurred throughout Togo since he assumed power after the death of his father, Gnassingbé Eyadéma, in February 2005.

Opposition protesters have called on the Togolese government to establish presidential term limits according to the 1992 constitutional referendum, and have called on Gnassingbé to resign. Opposition parties contested the results of the 2010 and 2015 presidential elections. From 2012 until the 2013 Togolese parliamentary election, opposition supporters protested certain electoral reforms believed to favour the ruling regime. Starting in August 2017, the opposition has held anti-government protests on a near-weekly basis, leading to a long-term period of domestic instability.

== Background ==
Gnassingbé Eyadéma helped lead two military coups, one in 1963 and another in 1967, in which he became the president of Togo. Opposition to Eyadéma's regime grew in the late 1980s as many people believed he was only working to benefit cronies from the army, his tribesmen, and his political allies. Inspired by anti-communist revolutions throughout Europe starting from 1989, and sparked by the trial of students for distributing anti-government material, Togolese students held demonstrations and strikes on 5 October 1990. This protest marked the start of a protest movement against Eyadéma's military regime.

During a wave of protests against Eyadéma, the government established a curfew, and announced it on 10 April 1991, one hour after it went into force. The next day, inhabitants of Lomé found 28 bodies on the lagoon of Bè. The National Human Rights Commission determined that the Togolese Armed Forces had carried out the massacre.

The Togolese government held a constitutional referendum in 1992 which included a two-term presidential limit, and Togo started holding multi-party elections in 1993. In December 2002, Eyadéma removed the presidential term limits, allowing him to run indefinitely.

== 2005 ==
Eyadéma died on 5 February 2005, and the Togolese military immediately installed his son Faure Gnassingbé as president. The Army Chief of Staff, Zakari Nandja, said this was meant to avoid a power vacuum. The Togolese government initially banned all protests for two months. However, about 1,000 people attended an anti-government rally in Lomé on 11 February 2005. The next day, about 3,000 people attended the protest. Security forces used tear gas, batons, and stun grenades on the protesters, killing at least three people and wounding dozens. The Togolese government said the security forces fired because the protesters tried to steal their weaponry.

Gnassingbé lifted the government's ban on protests on 18 February and announced that there would be a presidential election in 60 days. Opposition groups called on Gnassingbé to step down and held large protests in Lomé, Aného, Sokodé and Sinkanse. On 25 February, Gnassingbé, citing growing domestic and international pressure, announced he would resign as president. Opposition supporters objected to the appointment of Bonfoh Abass as interim president instead of Fambaré Ouattara Natchaba, accusing Abass of being too close to the Gnassingbé regime. Protesters threw stones at the police, who fired tear gas back at them to drive them back.

The presidential election was held on 24 April 2005, with the two frontrunners being Faure Gnassingbé and Emmanuel Bob-Akitani. Gnassingbé was declared the winner on 26 April. The Economic Community of West African States declared the results were fair, though opposition supporters heard reports of fraudulent ballot practices and vote rigging. Hundred of people rioted in the streets and clashed with the police and military. Young men reportedly threw Molotov cocktails at the police, and the opposition formed barriers in Bé. According to hospital sources, 11 people died and about 100 people were injured in the riot. Opposition supporters broke into a police station in Aného, attacked police officers, and attempted to burn the station. The police killed nine people and injured 61.

The Togolese government claimed that only 22 people died during the post-election violence. Amnesty International however reported a death toll of more than 150. The United Nations estimated that between 400 and 500 people were killed in electoral violence and mass riots. In May 2017, around 35,000 Togolese citizens fled to Benin and Ghana, citing abductions and forced disappearances, which were believed to be politically motivated.

== 2010–2011 ==
Gnassingbé defeated Jean-Pierre Fabre in the 2010 Togolese presidential election held on 4 March. Fabre's supporters ignored a government ban on protests on 7 March 2010 and faced off with security forces who blocked their access to the Bè neighbourhood. Opposition supporters held a demonstration on 9 March 2010. Those who resisted the security forces were sprayed with tear gas. Some demonstrators threw stones at the police and burned cars.

On 12 February 2011, about 15,000 opposition protesters marched through Lomé and called for the resignation of Gnassingbé's administration and the holding of free and fair elections. Claude Améganvi of the Workers' Party said the march was also in support of the Egyptian revolution of 2011 as part of the wider Arab Spring in Northern Africa. On 17 March 2011, security forces fired tear gas and rubber bullets on protesters in Lomé, who threw stones at them and burned tires.

== 2012–2013 ==
In early June 2012, the Togolese parliament amended the country's electoral code. The opposition criticised these changes, saying they favoured the ruling party. Thousands of protesters gathered in Lomé on 12–14 June 2012, forcing the city's main market to close. Protesters threw stones and vandalized buildings, and police fired tear gas at them. At least 27 people, including policemen and protesters, were injured during the protests.

Hundreds of supporters of the Let's Save Togo campaign protested against the Togolese government on 5 July 2012 in front of the French embassy in Lomé. The police fired tear gas on the protesters again, forcing them to disperse. The opposition held protests on 21–23 August 2012. On the first day, protesters planned to march from Bé to the commercial area Deckon, an area the government prohibited protesters from entering. Togolese authorities fired tear gas on the protesters ten minutes after it started. According to Let's Save Togo, more than 100 people were injured, and more than 125 people were arrested during the rallies. Thousands of opposition supporters participated in peaceful protests on 24–25 August 2012.

Isabelle Ameganvi discussing the sex strike with a Voice of America journalist.

Thousands of people attended a Let's Save Togo rally in Lomé on 26 August 2012 which encouraged Togolese women to participate in a week-long sex strike to galvanize men ito participation in the opposition movement against Gnassingbé. Opposition leader Isabelle Ameganvi said this was inspired by the 2003 sex strike of Liberian women led by Ellen Johnson Sirleaf which pushed for peace during the Second Liberian Civil War against Charles Taylor. Protesters gathered in Bé on 28 August 2012 and prepared to march against the government. Before they could start marching, Togolese security forces fired tear gas on them. The opposition held organized sit-ins, and the security forces fired tear gas on them on 6 September 2012.

In response to these protests, the government passed another electoral reform in September 2012. Opposition groups boycotted the talks because they believed the proposed term limits would allow Gnassingbé to potentially stay in office until at least 2025. On 15 September 2012, a mob armed with sticks and machetes entered an area where opposition supporters planned to protest. The mob prevented the opposition protest from proceeding and prevented journalists from taking photographs. Several ambassadors from Western countries expressed "deep concern" over the mob violence.

Thousands of women wearing red participated in a peaceful march organised by Let's Save Togo on 20 September 2012. The colour red was chosen to protest the precarious economic situation of women in Togo, as Togolese women traditionally made and sold red garments at the country's markets. Let's Save Togo held an opposition rally on 5 October 2012, the anniversary of the 1990 demonstration against Eyadéma. Security forces fired tear gas on them, injuring several people.

At an opposition protest in Lomé on 10 January 2013, several journalists were reportedly targeted during the protests, and at least four of them were injured. In late February 2013, three opposition supporters were charged with involvement in the fires that destroyed two Togolese markets in January 2013. On 12 March 2013, while Jean-Pierre Fabre was being questioned in Lomé, hundreds of his supporters tried to block the building's entrance. The police fired tear gas on them as the protesters threw stones.

On 14–17 March 2013, Togolese journalists held sit-ins to protest recently adopted media regulations which gave the government authority to shut down news outlets. On the first and last day of these protests, police fired tear gas and rubber bullets to disperse the crowd. Gnassingbé requested the amendments go through a constitutional review, and Togo's Constitutional Court declared them unconstitutional on 20 March 2013.

In April 2013, Togolese teachers went on strike to call for higher wages, and students protested in support of their teachers. The government temporarily closed its primary and secondary schools, citing property damage from the student protests. Two students were killed as a result of police efforts to disperse protests on 15 April in Dapaong. The government re-opened its schools on 22 April, though many teachers continued their strike and told their students to return home.

Étienne Yakanou, one of the opposition leaders detained in connection to the Lomé market fire, died on 10 May 2013. According to the government he died from malaria. The National Alliance for Change (ANC) accused the Togolese government of committing a "political assassination" by deliberately withholding treatment from Yakanou, and Amnesty International called for an investigation into his death. On 18 May 2013, a group of women from Let's Save Togo participated in topless protests inspired by the Ukrainian feminist organization FEMEN.

The opposition protests delayed the parliamentary election, which were originally scheduled for October 2012, to 25 July 2013. Gnassingbé's party won the majority of seats in the election, and the opposition declared that the results were fraudulent.

== 2014–2016 ==
Anti-government protesters marched through Lomé on 21 November 2014, while government supporters held a counter-protest on the beach. Agence France-Presse reported that protesters broke the law by marching near the country's parliament. Reuters reported that some protesters threw stones at security forces, who fired tear gas on them. Two opposition supporters were injured during the clashes. Thousands of Togolese continued protesting on 28 November 2014.

Gnassingbé won the country's April 2015 presidential election, scoring over 59% of the vote. The United Nations approved of how the election was conducted, but the main opposition party considered these results fraudulent as the ruling regime was actively suppressing their activities. Thousands of people marched through Lomé on 16 May 2015 to protest these election results. Opposition parties held demonstrations on 21 May 2016 in Lomé calling for meaningful and proportional electoral reform under the Global Political Agreement of 2007 to introduce term limits.

== 2017–2018 ==
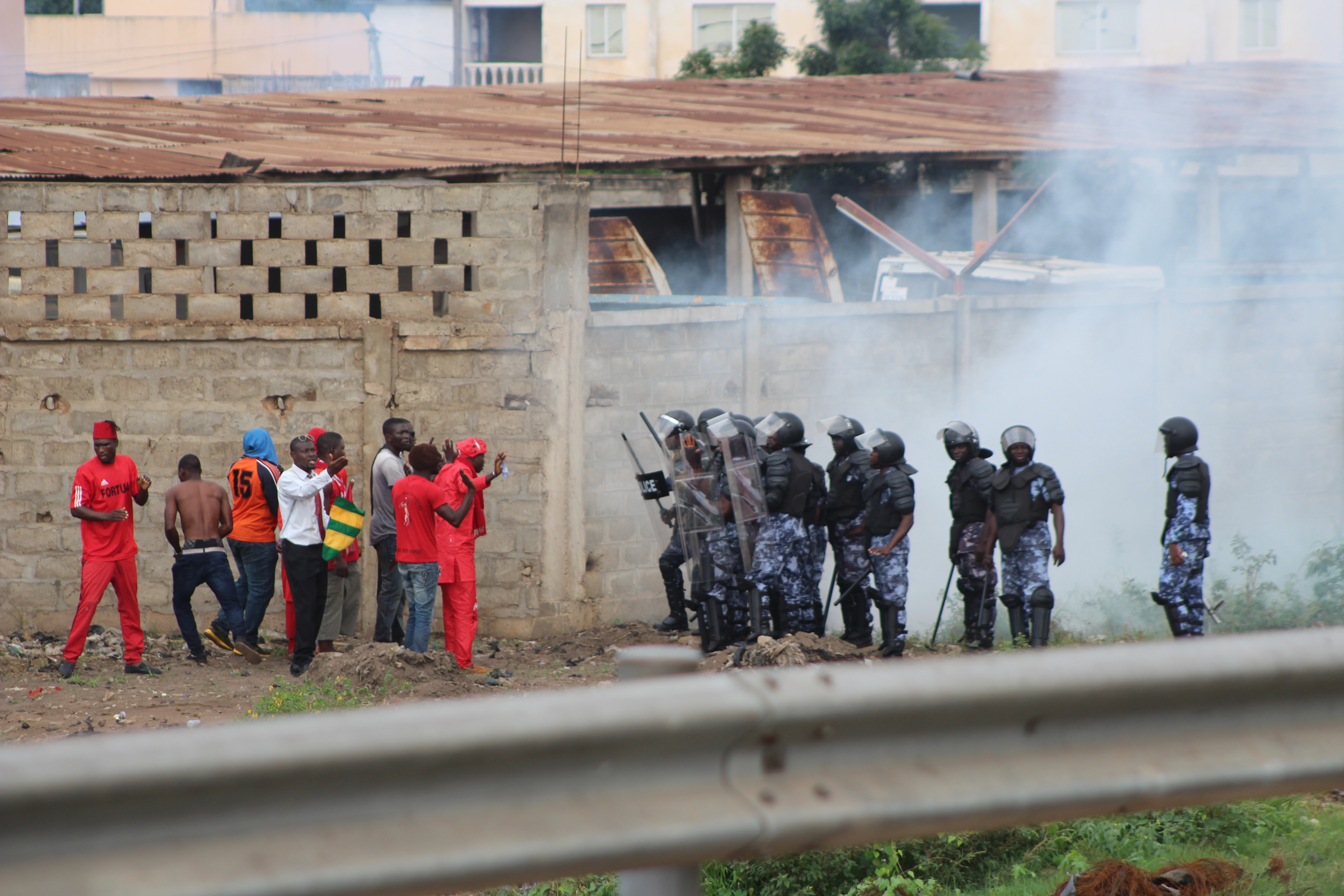
Protesters trying to fight the police in Lomé on 19 August 2017.

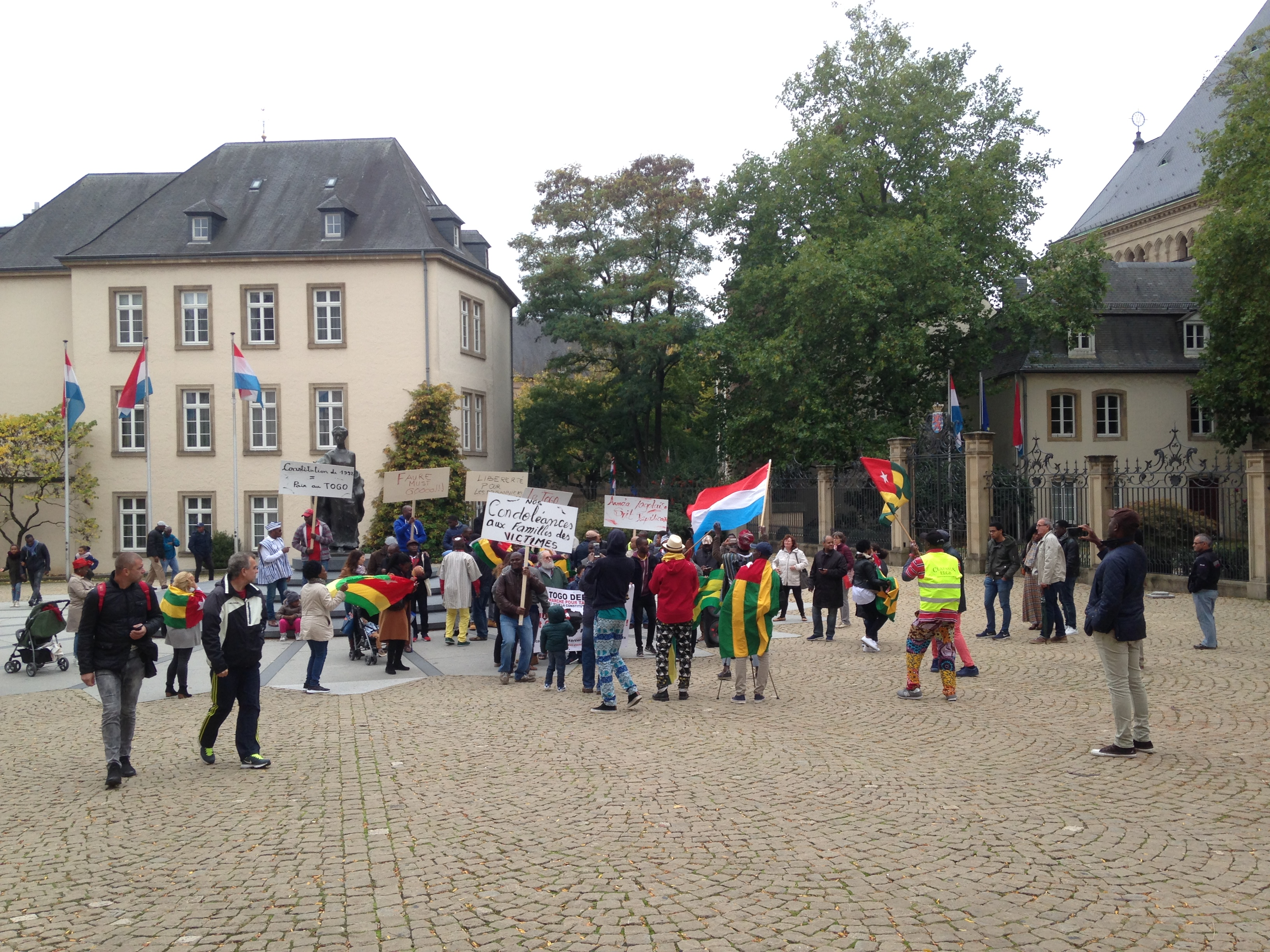
Protests against Faure Gnassingbé by the Togolese diaspora in Luxembourg...

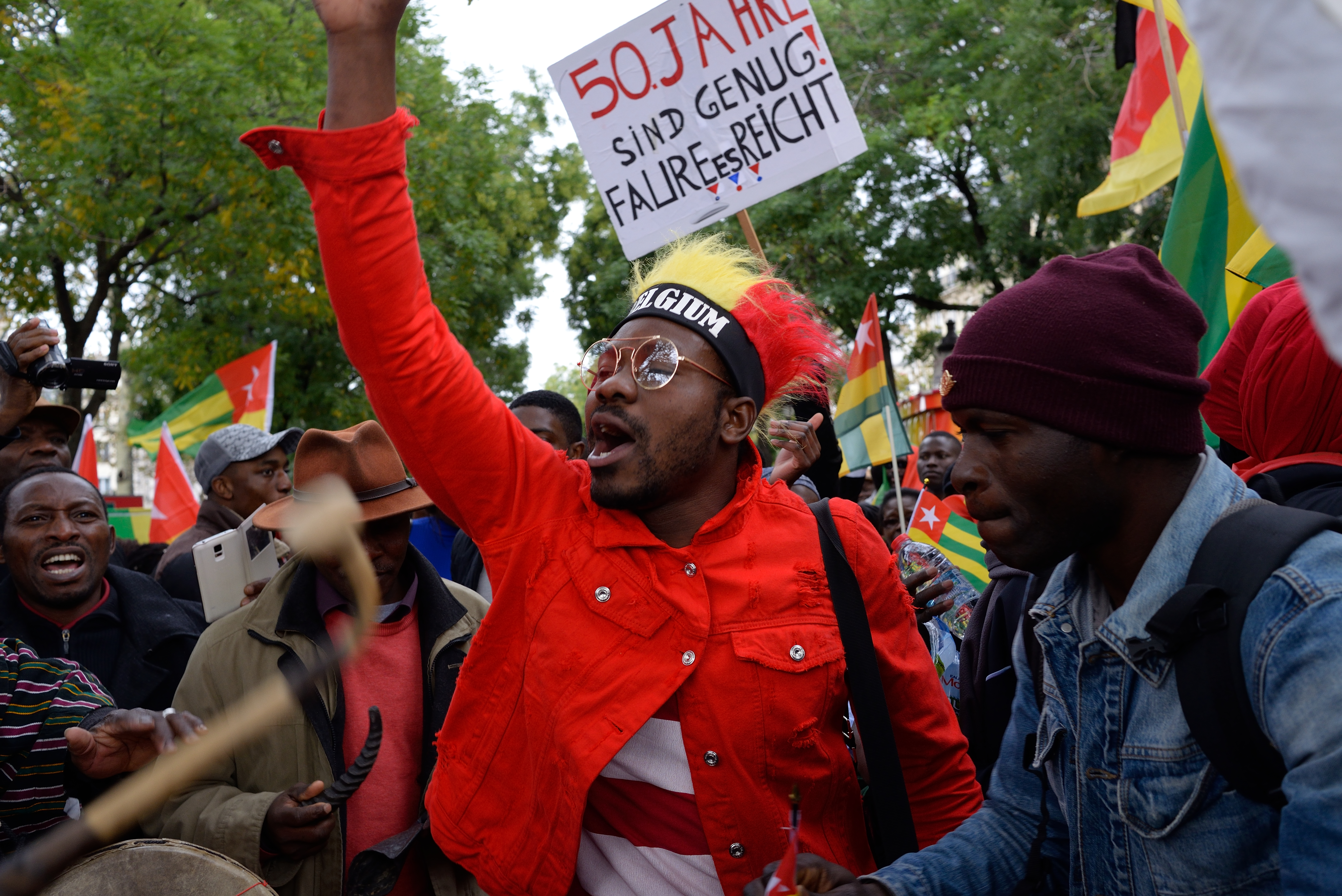
...and in Belgium on 7 October 2017.

On 19 August 2017, thousands of protesters took to the streets, mostly in the city of Sokodé. Protests also occurred in Lomé, Bafilo, Anié, and Kara. Security forces shot and killed two civilians while dispersing protesters. Other civilians burned security vehicles and killed seven members of the security force. About 27 people were arrested, and 15 protesters identified as supporters of the Pan African National Party were given jail sentences of 5–9 months. Opposition parties called for a general strike to take place on 25 August, which slowed business and caused Lomé to enter a security lockdown. Togolese minister Gilbert Bawara criticised the strike, calling it "the campaign of terror, intimidation and threats".

On 5 September 2017, in an effort to counter scheduled protests, the Toglose government cut off the internet nationwide, blocked the use of WhatsApp, and filtered international calls. Despite this, opposition parties started a large three-day protest in Lomé. Amnesty International estimated that about 100,000 people participated in a protest on 6 September 2017. At least 80 protesters were arrested the next day, and security forces in Lomé fired tear gas to disperse protesters. Normal access to the internet was restored on 11 September.

On 18 September 2017, the opposition boycotted the National Assembly's vote on a bill that would introduce term limits, saying it would allow making it subject to a referendum. The next day, the Togolese government slowed down the country's internet as the opposition prepared for more protests. According to Amnesty International, security forces used batons, bullets, and tear gas against protesters in Mango, killing a 9-year-old boy. Security minister Damehane Yark blamed the opposition for the boy's death, saying the protesters were using weapons. The next day, opposition leaders blamed the government for violently repressing protests in Northern Togo, and thousands of Togolese participated in anti-government demonstrations.

On 4 and 5 October 2017, thousands of protesters marched through Lomé and some created barricades. In response, the Togolese government shut down internet communication and mobile access to the internet. The Togolese government announced a ban on weekday protests on 10 October, though opposition parties vowed to defy this ban. Alpha Alassane, an imam affiliated with the opposition movement, was arrested in Sokodé on 16 October 2017, fueling tensions between the Togolese government and the opposition. A two-day protests started on 18 October throughout Togo. On the first day, four people—one in Lomé and three in Sokodé—were reportedly killed during clashes between protesters and security forces. Togo's security minister denied the reported deaths, saying that nobody was killed in Sokodé on this day. Some protesters in Lomé formed barricades, and police fired tear gas to disperse them.

The Togolese government lifted its ban on weekday protests on 4 November 2017. On 7 November the Togolese government released 42 of the protesters who were arrested in September and dropped arson charges against opposition leader Jean-Pierre Fabre. Thousands of protesters participated in three protests during this week, with the last one on 10 November.

The Economic Community of West African States (ECOWAS) held its 2017 summit on 16 December in Abuja, Nigeria instead of in Togo, likely because of political tension between the government and opposition. Around the time of this summit, thousands of protesters held anti-government marches. Tens of thousands of opposition supporters protested peacefully in Lomé on 31 December. Thousands of people in Togo participated in anti-government protests and counter-protests on 13 January 2018, the 55th anniversary of President Sylvanus Olympio's assassination. On 20 January 2018, the opposition held an anti-government demonstration in Lomé which coincided with the 2018 Women's March, where thousands of Togolese women mostly dressed in black marched through Lomé.

Ghanaian President Nana Akufo-Addo and Guinean President Alpha Condé started mediating talks between the Togolese government and opposition on 19 February 2018 in Lomé. The next day, Ghanaian mediators announced that the Togolese government would release 45 of the 92 people imprisoned for participating in the protests. On 6 March, Togo's opposition coalition announced it would resume protests, despite the previous agreement to suspend protests while government talks were underway. A couple days later these protests stopped upon Akufo-Addo's request. On the 11th, 12th, and 14 April 2018, the opposition held street protests and Togolese security forces tried to repress them; leading to about 25 injuries and one death. The opposition coalition parties called off planned street protests on 8 May 2018, citing a lack of security for the demonstrators and progress toward their goals.

== 2025 ==
On 24 June, a coalition of political groups known as “Hands Off My Constitution” said in a Facebook post it “strongly urges Faure Gnassingbé to immediately and unconditionally release all of the roughly one hundred political prisoners, and to take urgent measures to restore purchasing power to the population."

On 25 June, clashes broke out between protesters and security forces in several parts of Togo's capital Lomé.

== See also ==
- 2014 Burkinabé uprising
- Human rights in Togo
- National Alliance for Change
