= 2010–2011 Togolese protests =

- Date: March 7, 2010 – May 2011
- Location: Togo
- Caused by: Alleged electoral fraud during the 2010 Togolese presidential election; Violence against women
- Goals: Resignation of President Faure Gnassingbe; Fresh elections; Democracy and New elections
- Result: Protests suppressed by force

The 2010–2011 Togolese protests were riots and demonstrations and strikes against the government and results of the 2010 Togolese presidential election. Protests began in March 2010. Protests saw violence against each other, stand-offs with police and brutality. As protests escalated and snowballed into a movement, more violence and crackdowns followed, with injuries and deaths reported on both sides.

== Background ==
Gnassingbé defeated Jean-Pierre Fabre in the 2010 Togolese presidential election held on 4 March. Fabre's supporters ignored a government ban on protests on 7 March 2010 and faced off with security forces who blocked their access to the Bè neighbourhood. Opposition supporters held a demonstration on 9 March 2010. Those who resisted the security forces were sprayed with tear gas. Some demonstrators threw stones at the police and burned cars.

On 12 February 2011, about 15,000 opposition protesters marched through Lomé and called for the resignation of Gnassingbé's administration and the holding of free and fair elections. Claude Améganvi of the Workers' Party said the march was also in support of the Egyptian revolution of 2011 as part of the wider Arab Spring in Northern Africa. On 17 March 2011, security forces fired tear gas and rubber bullets on protesters in Lomé, who threw stones at them and burned tires.

== 2011 student riots ==
On July 8, students and government representatives signed a formal agreement allowing current students to continue on the classic academic system or switch to the LMD system at their option and which stated that the government would invest 2.4 billion CFA francs (roughly US$4,800,000) into the construction of new lecture halls and versatile teaching blocks at the University of Lomé and the University of Kara.

== See also ==
- Protests against Faure Gnassingbe
- 2017–2018 Togolese protests
