= 2017–2018 Togolese protests =

Social unrest in Togo

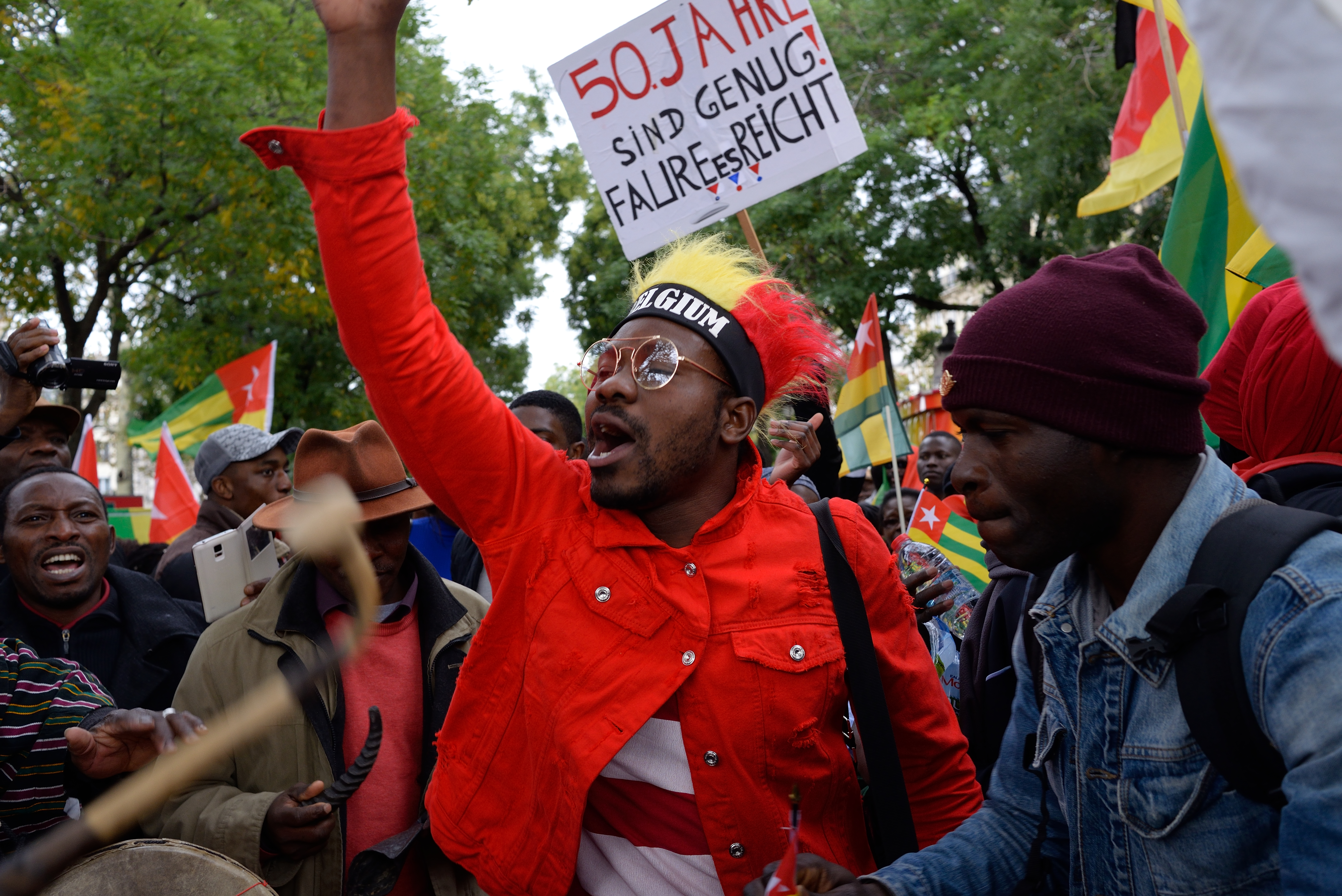
Protest against Faure Gnassingbé in Belgium in October 2017

In 2017–18, protests took place in Togo against the 50 year rule of Gnassingbé Eyadéma and his son Faure Gnassingbé. The protesters demanded that the president honour the 1992 constitution, and demanding that he step down immediately. Gnassingbé offered the protesters the option of enacting the two-term limit set in the constitution effective from 2018, thus ensuring that he could stay in power until 2030. This has been rejected by the opposition. However, on 8 May 2019 the Togolese Parliament voted unanimously to accept this amendment and imposed this non-retroactive term limit on the president's office.

As the protests continued, the opposition started focusing more on protesting Gnassingbé's rule. Starting in August 2017, the opposition held protests on a near-weekly basis. The scale of the protests have been enormous, with some estimates claiming 800,000 present at one protest in a country of 6.6 million. The demonstrations are also taking place all over the country, even in the north, the traditional power base for the Gnassingbé family. The Togolese government has responded to these protests by shutting down the internet. The protesters utilised social media, with the hashtag #togodebut for publicity. The protests and police response have resulted in the deaths of at least 16 people, including two soldiers. In response to the protests, Gnassingbé offered some concessions to the opposition, but held onto power due to his crackdown on activists.

== History ==
=== August 2017 ===
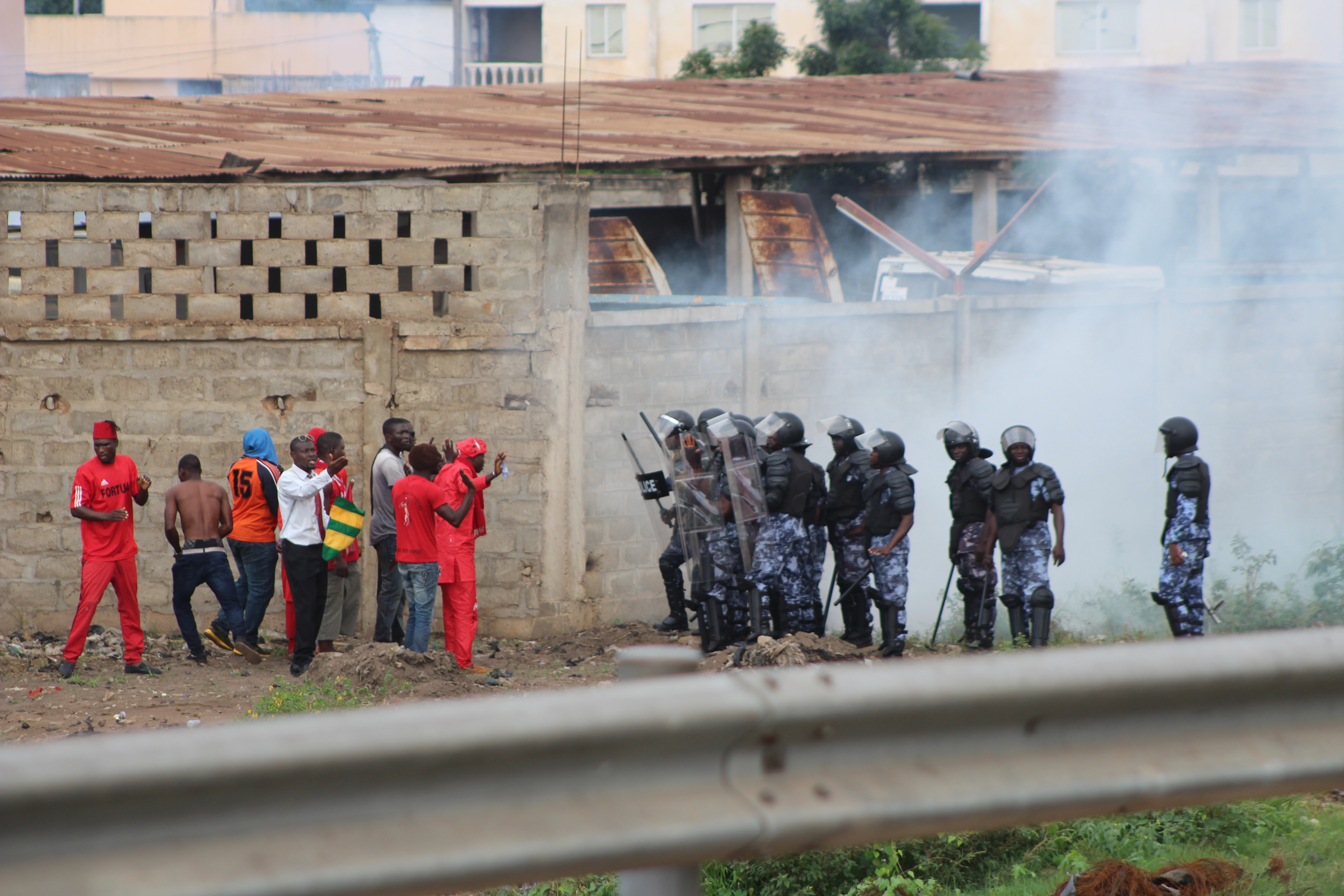
Protesters trying to fight the police in Lomé, 19 August 2017.

On 19 August, thousands of protesters took to the streets, mostly in the city of Sokodé. Some protesters chanted "50 years is too long". Protests also occurred in Lomé, Bafilo, Anié, and Kara. Security forces shot and killed two civilians while dispersing protesters. Other civilians burned security vehicles and killed seven security men. Photographs of the violence spread on social media. About 27 people were arrested, and 15 protesters identified as supporters of the Pan African National Party were given jail sentences of 5–9 months. Some of those arrested later said they were tortured at the headquarters of Togo's secret police, and placed in Lomé's central prison.

Opposition parties called for a general strike to take place on 25 August, which slowed business and caused Lomé to enter a security lockdown. Togolese minister Gilbert Bawara criticized the strike, calling it "the campaign of terror, intimidation and threats". Togolese Prime Minister Komi Sélom Klassou led a pro-government counter-protest in Lomé on 29 August. Ghanaian immigration officers increased security of the Ghana–Togo border for Togolese fleeing to Ghana because of the unrest.

=== September 2017 ===
On 5 September, in an effort to disrupt planned protests, the Togolese government cut off the internet, blocked the use of WhatsApp, and filtered international calls. Despite this, the opposition parties CAP 2015 and the Pan-African National Party started a large three-day protest in Lomé. Amnesty International estimated that about 100,000 people participated in a protest on 6 September. At least 80 protesters were arrested on 7 September for "preparing to commit violent acts, vandalise shops." Security forces in Lomé fired tear gas to disperse the protesters. Normal access to the internet was restored on 11 September. The United Nations urged the Togolese government to address the "legitimate expectations" of the protesters.

Togo's National Assembly introduced a bill meant to reform the country's electoral system and introduce presidential term limits of two five-year terms. The opposition objected to the bill's wording, saying that the term limits would not be retroactive. The opposition boycotted the National Assembly's vote on the bill on 18 September, making it subject to a referendum. The next day, the Togolese government slowed down the country's internet as the opposition prepared for more protests. According to Amnesty International, security forces used batons, bullets, and tear gas against protesters in Mango, killing a 9-year-old boy. Security minister Damehane Yark blamed the opposition for the boy's death, saying the protesters were using weapons. A picture of a cow killed by the military in the village Kparatao spread online and became a symbol of the protests. The next day, opposition leaders blamed the government for repressing protests in Northern Togo, and thousands of Togolese participated in anti-government demonstrations.

=== October 2017 ===
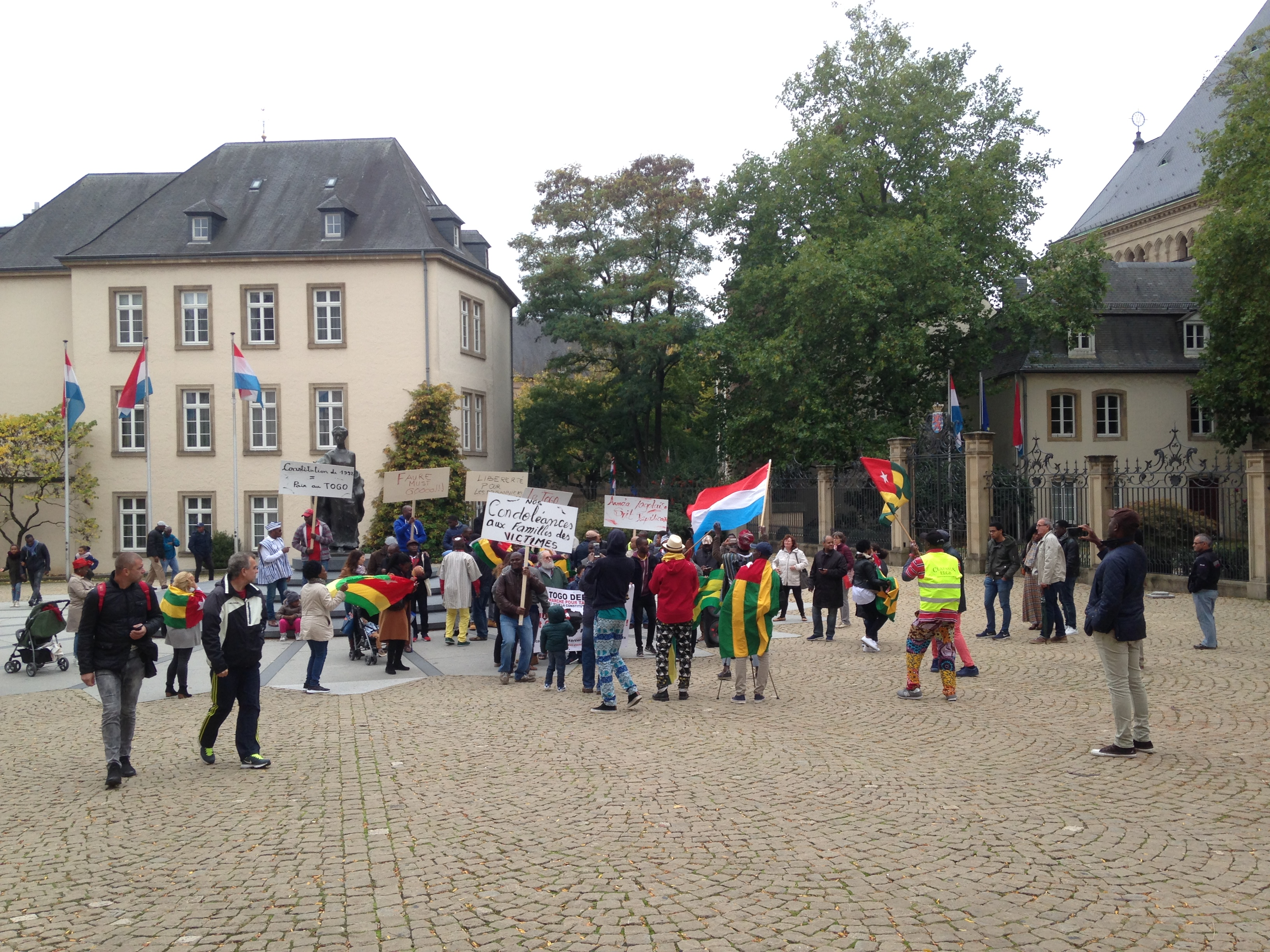
Protests by the Togolese diaspora in Luxembourg city, 7 October 2017.

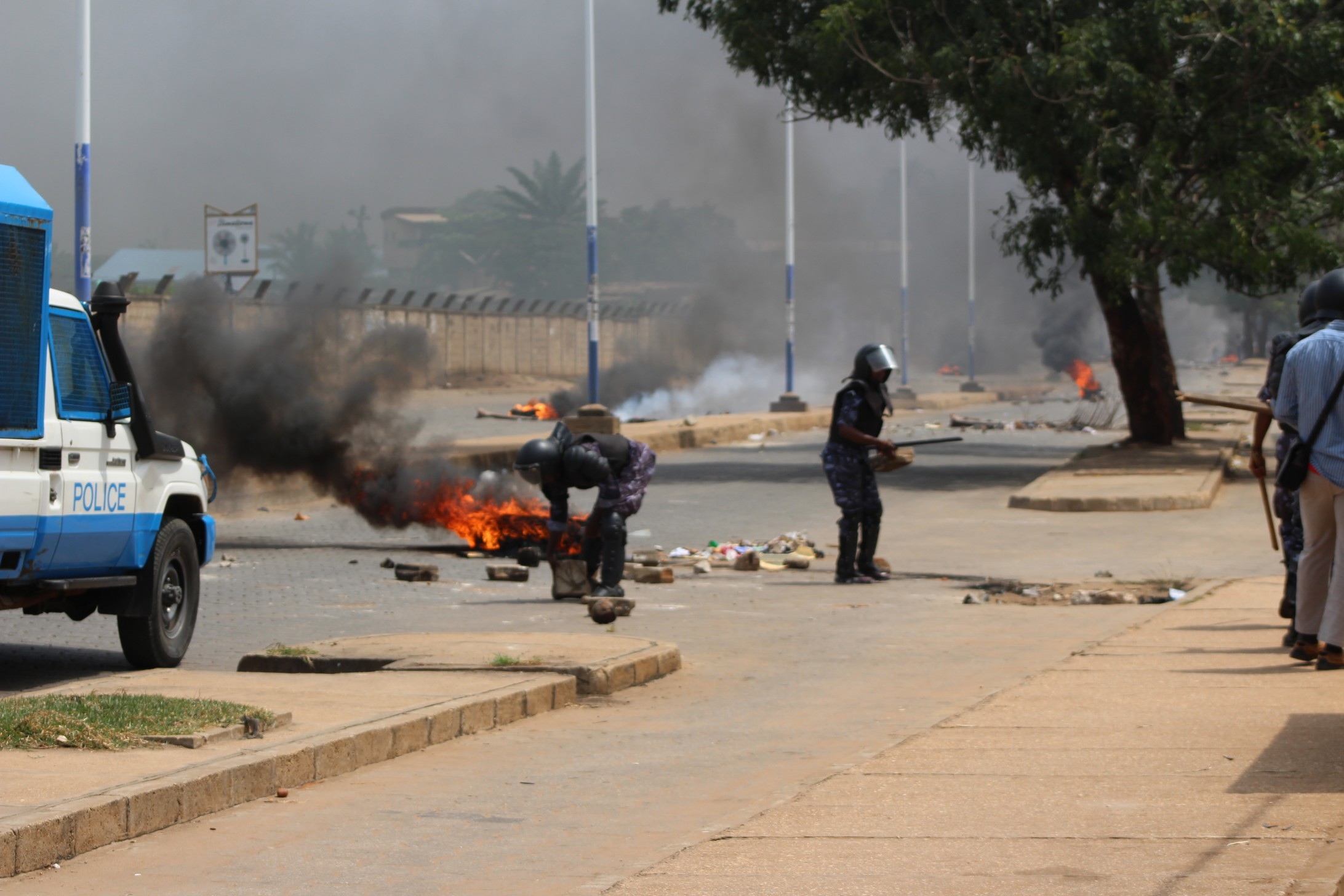
Protests in Lomé, 18 October 2017.

On 3 October, the United States embassy in Togo issued a security warning concerning transportation issues that could arise because of upcoming protests. On 4 and 5 October, thousands of protesters marched through Lomé and some created barricades. In response, the Togolese government shut down internet communication and mobile access to the internet. The Togolese government announced a ban on weekday protests on 10 October, though opposition parties said they would defy this ban.

Alpha Alassane, an imam affiliated with the opposition movement, was arrested in Sokodé on 16 October for allegedly inciting violence with his followers. The arrest fueled tension between the Togolese government and the opposition. A two-day protests started on 18 October throughout Togo. On the first day, four people—one in Lomé and three in Sokodé—were reportedly killed during clashes between protesters and security forces. Yark Damehame, Togo's security minister, denied the reported deaths, saying that nobody was killed in Sokodé on this day. Some protesters in Lomé formed barricades, and police fired tear gas to disperse them. About 300 Togolese nationals attempted to participate in a protest in Accra, Ghana, but the police ruled the demonstration was unlawful and arrested 26 protesters.

Gambia's Foreign Minister Ousainou Darboe called on Gnassingbe to resign, although he retracted the statement a few days later and said it was a matter for the Togolese people. U.S. Department of State spokesperson Heather Nauert called on the Togolese government to protect its citizens' rights and engage in dialogue with the protesters.

=== November 2017 ===
The Togolese government lifted its ban on weekday protests on 4 November. On 7 November the Togolese government released 42 of the protesters who were arrested in September and dropped arson charges against opposition leader Jean-Pierre Fabre. Opposition parties saw this as an attempt to appease their demands. Thousands of protesters participated in three protests during this week, with the last one on 10 November.

Gnassingbé blamed the opposition for violence at its protests. Opposition leaders called this a "declaration of war" against the Togolese people. Gnassingbé visited Sokodé in late November 2017, saying, "My exchanges with the imams and senior figures left me reassured that our country remains indivisible."

=== December 2017 ===
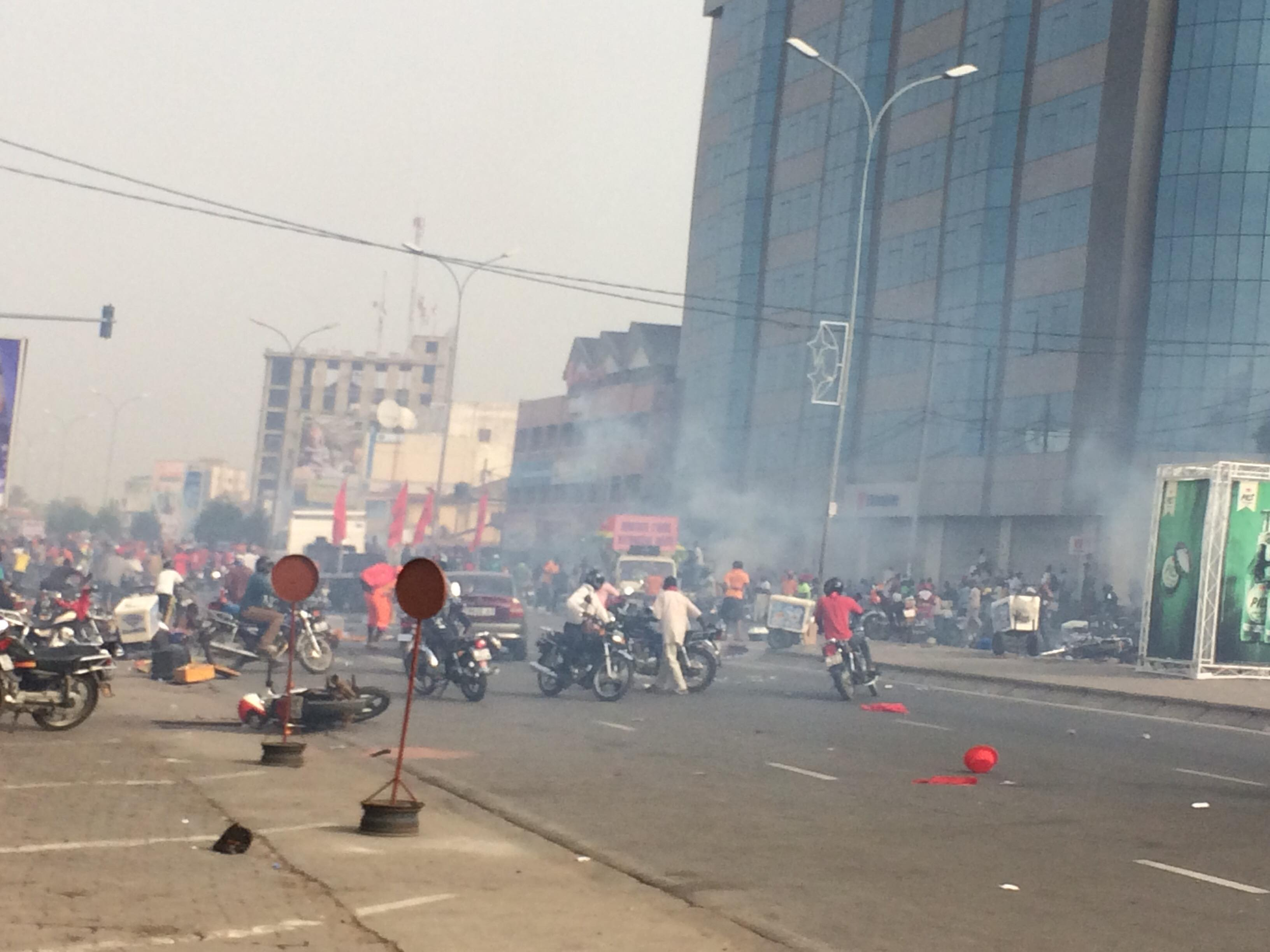
Confrontation in Deckon district, Lomé, Togo, 28 December 2017.

The Economic Community of West African States (ECOWAS) held its 2017 summit on 16 December in Abuja, Nigeria instead of in Togo, likely because of political tension between the government and opposition. Around the time of this summit, thousands of protesters held anti-government marches. In Accra, Ghana, police arrested twelve members of the Ghana–Togo Solidarity movement, including Bernard Mornah, the chairman of the People's National Convention, for protesting the situation in Togo.

The opposition held demonstrations on 28 December, and the police arrest of a young man was filmed. Tens of thousands of opposition supporters protested peacefully in Lomé on 31 December.

=== January 2018 ===
On 3 January 2018, Gnassingbé called for the opposition to participate in government talks to resolve their differences. Thousands of people in Togo participated in an anti-government protest on 13 January 2018, the 55th anniversary of the Sylvanus Olympio's assassination. Counter-protesters held demonstrations in support of the government. Supporters of the Togolese opposition also protested in Berlin and Washington, DC.

On 20 January 2018, the same day as the 2018 Women's March, the opposition held an anti-government demonstration focused on female involvement. During the protest, thousands of Togolese women mostly dressed in black marched through Lomé, accompanied by male opposition supporters. Starting on 31 January 2018, Togolese healthcare workers went on a two-day strike to demand that the government provide better health services.

=== February 2018 ===
On 15 February, Amnesty International, Front Line Defenders and Africans Rising issued a joint statement criticising Togo's treatment of activists involved in the protests.

In early February 2018, the opposition agreed to stop holding protests while mediators from Guinea and Ghana visited Togo. However, on 4 February 2018, the day after these mediators suggested that Togo hold talks on constitutional reform, thousands of protesters marched through Lomé. Ghanaian President Nana Akufo-Addo and Guinean President Alpha Condé started mediating talks between the Togolese government and opposition on 19 February in Lomé. The next day, Ghanaian mediators announced that the Togolese government would release 45 of the 92 people imprisoned for participating in the protests.

=== March 2018 ===
On 6 March, Togo's opposition coalition announced it would resume protests, despite the previous agreement to suspend protests while government talks were underway. Eric Dupuy, the coalition spokesman, said this was because the Togolese government failed to prepare for upcoming parliamentary elections. Ghanaian President Akufo-Addo met with 14 Togolese opposition leaders on the next day at The Flagstaff House in Accra, Ghana. Two days later, this opposition coalition accepted the Akufo-Addo's request to continue suspending protests for the next week while the talks continued. These talks resumed on 23 March.

=== April 2018 ===
The opposition coalition planned protests in Lomé and other towns on 11–12 April, and the Togolese government said this would violate their agreement with Akufo-Addo. On the first day of this demonstration, the police fired tear gas on the protesters. On 14 April 2018, security forces in Lomé fired tear gas near the headquarters of the Democratic Convention of African Peoples About 25 people were injured during these three days of protest, and one person died from his injuries. Security forces also prevented people from protesting in Kpalimé. Heads of state in ECOWAS held talks in Lomé on this day, and they called on Akufo-Addo and Condé to step up their reform efforts and end political violence.

=== May 2018–December 2018 ===
The opposition coalition parties announced on 8 May that they were calling off protests planned in the coming days, citing the lack of security and progress with their objectives. On 17 June, the coalition called for its supporters to participate in a sit-at-home general strike the next day, and the government urged people to boycott this protest.

The Togolese government and opposition coalition held talks on 27 June, and Akufo-Addo and Condé, the co-facilitators of these talks, called for continued dialogue and suspended street protests. The government banned street protests from 23 July to 1 August while Togo hosted an ECOWAS summit. On 3 November 2018, over a thousand people protested in Lomé to demand the release of imprisoned protesters.

On 6 December, ahead of planned protests against the Togolese parliamentary election, 2018, the government again banned demonstrations.

== See also ==
- 1990-1991 Togo protests
- 2005 Togo protests and riots
- 2010-11 Togolese protests
