= Edem Tengue =

Togolese politician

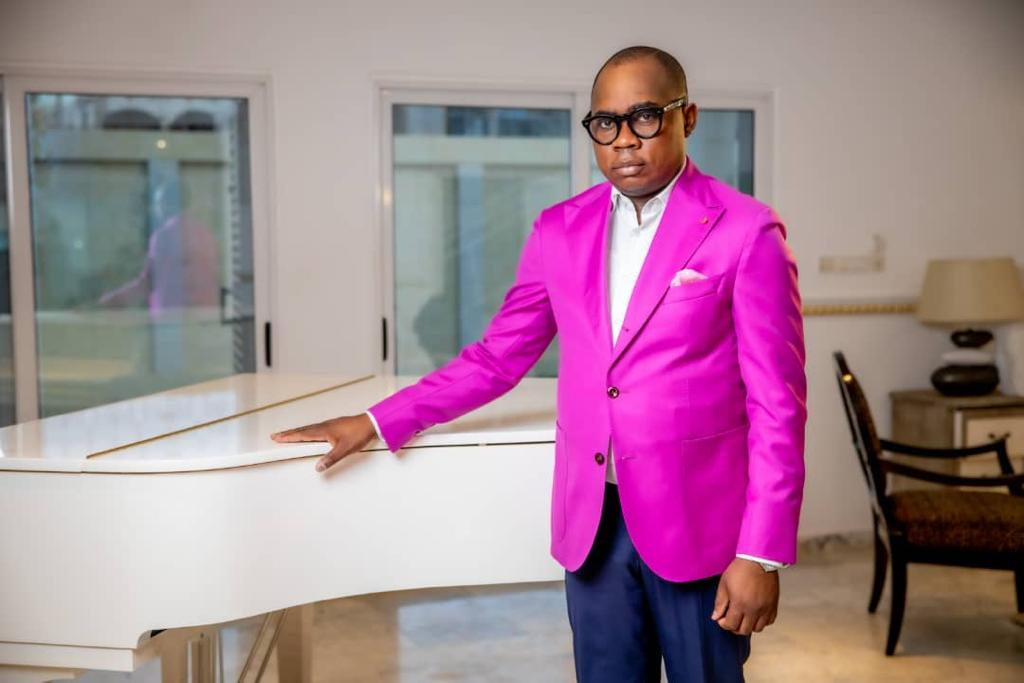
Edem Tengue in his family house

Kokou Edem Tengue is a politician born on September 24, 1980, in Lomé. He is a Togolese business executive, economist, and chartered accountant.

On October 1, 2020, he was appointed Minister of Maritime Economy, Fisheries, and Coastal Protection in the Victoire Tomegah Dogbé government.

He left the Ministry of Maritime Economy on August 20, 2024, to become Minister at the Presidency of the Republic which he left again few weeks later for business and management positions .

== Early life and education ==
Edem Tengue is the son of Kokou Frederic Tengue, head of Togo's banking training center from 1986 to 2004, and Danhoui Amegnihoue, a civil servant in the Togolese Ministry of National Education. [necessary]

A graduate of Sciences Po Paris, the University of Leicester, and the University of Birmingham, he joined the Maersk Group's training program in Copenhagen from 2003 to 2005. He also earned an MBA from Imperial College London.

== Career ==
From 2005 to 2007, he was assigned as Assistant to the Chief Financial Officer of the Group's regional office, which covered all of Scandinavia and the Baltic States. He was then based in Gothenburg, Sweden.

He returned to Togo as Chief Financial Officer of the three group companies: Maersk Togo S.A., Damco Togo S.A., and Lomé Terminal Service, which the Maersk Group had created to bid for the privatization of handling activities at the Port of Lomé. He was appointed Commercial Director and then Managing Director of the Togolese subsidiary of the Danish conglomerate Maersk.

He was elected President of the Association of Maritime Navigation Companies of Togo.

As an economist, Tengue has worked extensively on sovereign debt issues in African countries, culminating in a dissertation at the University of Birmingham and a doctoral thesis at the University of Lomé on the determinants and sustainability of public debt. He argues, in particular, that debt relief programs are not very effective if they do not address the determinants of debt such as demographics, imports, and exports. He argues that it is by reducing demographics and imports and increasing exports in value that the trend of debt accumulation in African countries can be sustainably reversed. He also argues that southern states with a coastal coastline should, through the development and sustainable development of this coastline (port activities, tourism activities), create a showcase of prosperity that should spill over into their hinterland.

=== Political career ===
He was elected to the Togolese National Assembly in the Haho constituency under the UNIR party banner during the 2018 legislative elections. However, he resigned after three months.

On October 1, 2020, he was appointed Minister of Maritime Economy.

In the legislative and regional elections of April 29, 2024, he was re-elected in the Haho constituency. He resigne from the parliament few weeks later .

On August 20, 2024, he was appointed Minister at the Presidency of the Republic. He left that position few weeks later .

On the political level, in his memoirs at the Paris Institute of Political Studies, he asserts that the link between democracy and development cannot be clearly established, contrary to the promises of the La Baule Discourse. He argues that it is better to build democratic fundamentals through the construction of a rule of law and economic freedoms.

The man who was Togolese's first minister of maritime economy and coastal protection believes that maritime stakeholders are on the front line in saving biodiversity. He advocates for a blue economy that would be an accelerator of sustainable growth. His ministerial department has emphasized aquaculture and imposed a sub-regional biological rest period.

== Professional associations ==
Tengue is an associate member of the Chartered Institute of Management Accountants of the United Kingdom (CIMA) the Certified Practising Accountant | CPA Australia (CPA Australia), and the Leadership and Management Institute of the United Kingdom ILM.

== Awards and recognition ==
- 2017: Among the 20 Young Leaders of the French-African Foundation
- 2018: Choiseuil ranking of tomorrow's economic leaders
- 2022: Among the thirty most influential young economists in sub-Saharan Africa of the ICCE (Institute of Certified Chartered Economists)
- 2018: Officer of the Order of Mono
