= 1990–1991 Togo protests =

1990–1991 protests
- Date: October 5, 1990 – November 1991
- Location: Togo
- Caused by: Fraud and unemployment; Repression of media and Togolese civilians
- Goals: Resignation of President Gnassingbe Eyadema; Fresh elections
- Result: Protests suppressed by force

The 1990–1991 Togo protests occurred in opposition to then-president Gnassingbe Eyadema and his reforms. Strikes and demonstrations began by students on 5 October and soon became a mass movement which saw deaths and beatings while shootings and clashes between pro-government and anti-government demonstrators took place. The protests ended violently with clashes in November 1991.

== Background ==
Gnassingbé Eyadéma helped lead two military coups, one in 1963 and another in 1967, in which he became the President of Togo. Opposition to Eyadéma's regime grew in the late 1980s as many people believed he was only working to benefit cronies from the army, his tribesmen, and his political allies. Inspired by anti-communist revolutions throughout Europe starting from 1989, and sparked by the trial of students for distributing anti-government material, Togolese students held demonstrations and strikes on 5 October 1990. This protest marked the start of a protest movement against Eyadéma's military regime.

== Protests ==
During a wave of protests against Eyadéma, the government established a curfew, and announced it on 10 April 1991, one hour after it went into force. The next day, inhabitants of Lomé found 28 bodies on the lagoon of Bè. The National Human Rights Commission determined that the Togolese Armed Forces had carried out the massacre.

The Togolese government held a constitutional referendum in 1992 which included a two-term presidential limit, and Togo started holding multi-party elections in 1993. In December 2002, Eyadéma removed the presidential term limits, allowing him to run indefinitely.

== Aftermath ==
Protests re-erupted in 1992 demanding a new constitution which led to a constitutional referendum. The crisis in 1990 saw closures of schools and ghost towns nationwide. Rallies in support of the government was held in December 1991. As a result of the movement, the government made a ban on demonstrations and made restrictions thus tightening normal life with restrictions. Security forces and the military stepped up their force against protestors as a result of the protests of 1990–1991.

== See also ==
- Protests against Faure Gnassingbe
- 2017–2018 Togolese protests
