= Women's strike =

Women's strike may refer to:

- Women's Strike for Equality (1970)
- 1975 Icelandic women's strike
- All-Poland Women's Strike - Strajk kobiet (since 2016)
- International Women's Strike (2017)
- Day Without a Woman (2017)
- 2018 Spanish women's strike
- 2019 Swiss women's strike
- Global Women's Strike
- Women Strike for Peace

== See also ==
- Sex strike
- Women's March
