= 2018 Togolese parliamentary election =

← 2013	20 December 2018	2024 →
- All 91 seats in the National Assembly; 46 seats needed for a majority
- Turnout: 59.25%
Party	Leader	Seats	+/–
UNIR	Faure Gnassingbé	59	−3
UFC	Jean-Pierre Fabre	7	+4
NET	Gerry Taama	3	0
MPDD	Agbéyomé Kodjo	2	New
PDP	Innocent Kagbara	1	New
MRC	Frédéric Abass Kaboua	1	New
Independent		18	+17
This lists parties that won seats. See the complete results below.
Prime Minister before	Prime Minister after
Komi Sélom Klassou; UNIR	Komi Sélom Klassou; UNIR

Parliamentary elections were held in Togo on 20 December 2018. They had been initially scheduled for July 2018, but were postponed until ECOWAS called for polling to take place on 20 December. The main opposition parties, which formed Aliance C14, boycotted the elections following the refusal of President Faure Gnassingbé to fully cancel proposed constitution reforms that would allow him to run for two more terms beyond his current ending term in 2020.

== Electoral system ==
The 91 members of the National Assembly are elected by closed list proportional representation from 30 multi-member constituencies ranging in size from two to ten seats. Seats are allocated using the highest averages method.

== Campaign ==
A total of 850 candidates ran for the 91 available seats, consisting of 105 lists submitted by political parties and 25 lists of independent candidates.

== Results ==
Party	Votes	%	Seats	+/–
Union for the Republic			59	–3
Union of Forces for Change			7	+4
New Togolese Commitment			3	–
Patriotic Movement for Democracy and Development			2	New
Pan-African Democratic Party			1	–
Movement of Centrist Republicans			1	–
Pan-African Patriotic Convergence			0	0
Union of Nationalists for Work			0	New
Africa Togo Ecology			0	New
Party for Democracy and Renewal			0	New
Emerging Leaders' Circle			0	New
Independents			18	+17
Total			91	0
Valid votes	1,751,110	93.66		
Invalid/blank votes	118,607	6.34		
Total votes	1,869,717	100.00		
Registered voters/turnout	3,155,837	59.25		
Source: Constitutional Court
