= Babylas Boton =

African journalist and political presenter

Babylas Boton is an African journalist and political presenter. He is the anchor for the channel Africa 24 which is broadcast across much of western and central Africa. He regularly interviews political figures and representatives from various French-speaking African nations whether it is Sidya Toure of Guinea, Jean-Louis Billon of Côte d'Ivoire or Isabelle Ameganvi of Togo etc. His native language is French.

== Awards and Recognition ==
This African journalist, political presenter and information director of Africa 24 is named best journalist of Africa in 2017. His dedication was made Saturday, February 24, 2018 in Dakar during the gala of the integration organized by the operators for the guarantee of economic emergence. Known for her insight, rigor and professionalism in the conduct of political broadcasts and debates with leading figures on the continent, the consecration of Babylas Boton was unanimously approved by the audience of personalities taking part in this gala. Accustomed to awards for the quality of his broadcasts and his impartiality in the conduct of debates, this distinguished journalist has already received many awards, including the international prize for best journalist, director of major interviews and balanced information during the post-electoral crisis organized by the panafrican organization "West Africa Development" on July 26, 2014 in Paris. A prominent figure in Africa 24, which is broadcast in much of West and Central Africa, Babylas Boton regularly interviews political figures and representatives of various French-speaking African nations.

== Biography ==
A journalist for more than 20 years, Babylas Boton is one of the most prominent figures in the African media scene. Famous interviewer and specialist in major debates, Africa 24's Director of Information has distinguished himself in major events on the African continent.

A native of this chain since its inception in 2008, Babylas Boton has risen through the ranks, serving successively as associate editor, editor-in-chief, and director of magazines, before becoming the current director of information. and the writing of this pan-African chain.

His talk show, a broken interview with African political figures, gave him a certain status in the journalism profession. This has earned him several awards and nominations, including that of Best Journalist of Africa in 2017.

After studying linguistics and journalism in his native Benin, he made his debut in the famous daily newspaper Le Matinal. Arriving in France in 2002, he joined the International School of Audiovisual Creation and Realization (EICAR), and graduated with Journalism and Director degrees. This is how the channel Télésud reaches out to him with the programs Le Grand Cercle and Arrêt sur info, which he presented for years, before going to put his skills at the service of development of the chain Africa 24.

His knowledge and background earned him the call of Senghor University of Egypt, where he was a lecturer for students in Master Communication - Media.
