= 2020 Togolese presidential election =

- 22 February 2020
- Registered: 3,614,056
- Turnout: 76.63% (▲15.74pp)
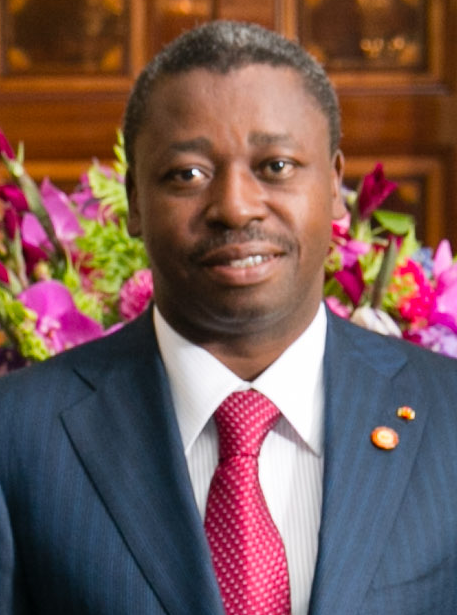

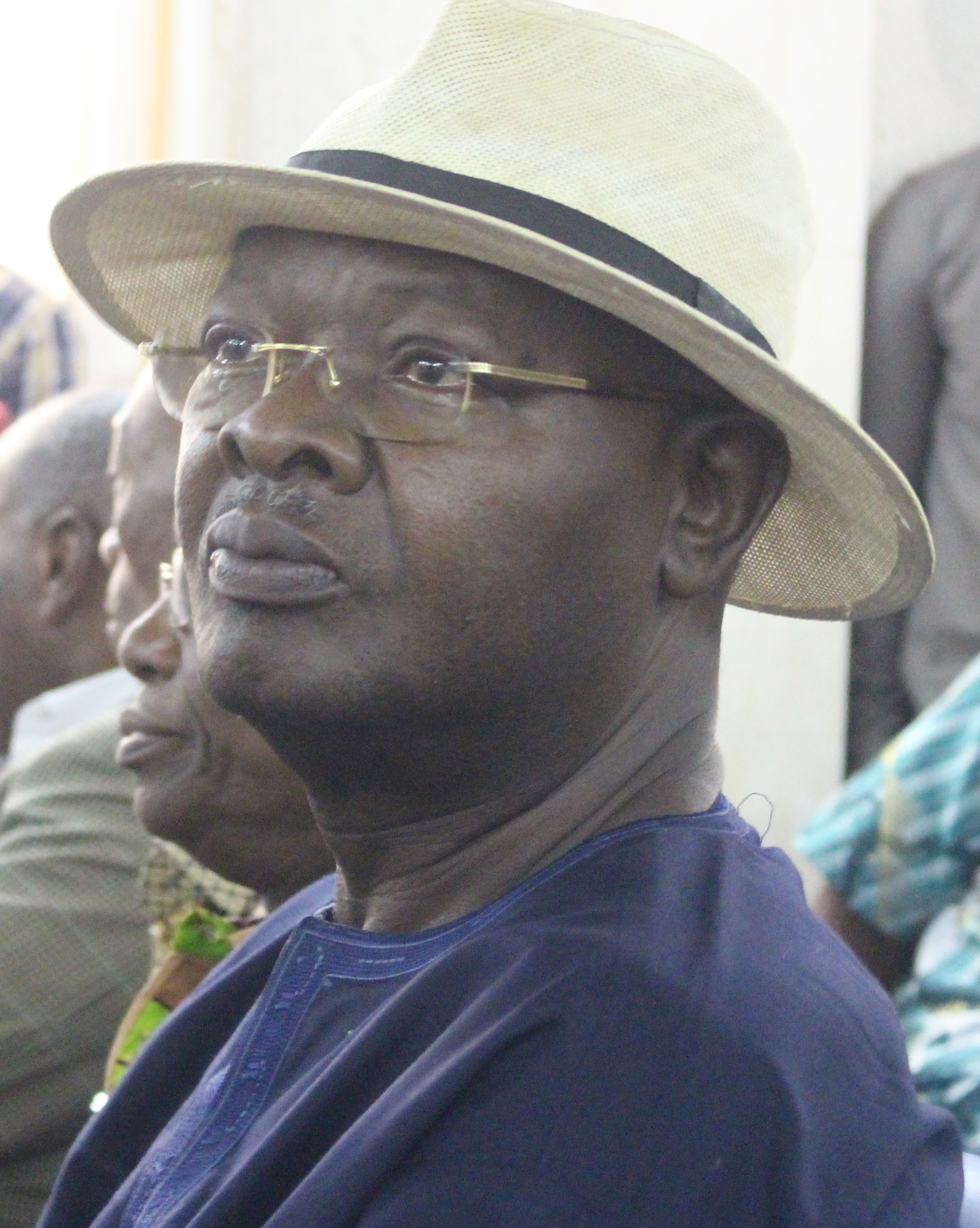
Nominee	Faure Gnassingbé	Agbéyomé Kodjo
Party	UNIR	MPDD
Popular vote	1,760,309	483,926
Percentage	70.78%	19.46%
- Results by region Gnassingbé: 80-90% 90+% Kodjo: 40–50%
President before election
Faure Gnassingbé
UNIR
Elected President
Faure Gnassingbé
UNIR

Presidential elections were held in Togo on 22 February 2020. Incumbent president Faure Gnassingbé of the Union for the Republic (UPR) was re-elected for his fourth term with 71% of the vote in the first round. His closest challenger was Agbéyomé Kodjo, a former prime minister and leader of the newly established Patriotic Movement for Democracy and Development, who received 19% of the vote.

== Electoral system ==
Constitutional amendments approved in May 2019 changed the electoral system for the presidency to the two-round system, replacing the previous first-past-the-post system.

The amendments were made following the December 2018 parliamentary elections, which had been boycotted by fourteen opposition parties in protest against 'bias', a refusal to return to the 1992 constitution, and using constituencies boundaries that favoured the UPR. As a result, the ruling UPR had won 59 of the 91 seats.

The constitutional amendments also reintroduced term limits that had been abolished in 2002. The changes limiting a president to serving two five-year terms. However, the limits did not apply retrospectively, allowing Faure Gnassingbé to serve two future terms in addition to the three he had already served.

== Campaign ==
In October 2019 the main opposition party, the National Alliance for Change, confirmed its leader Jean-Pierre Fabre would be its candidate.

In January 2020, Emeritus Archbishop of Lomé, Philippe Fanoko Kpodzro, called for the suspension of the elections to allow electoral reforms to be carried out. Kpodzro had endorsed and campaigned for Agbéyomé Kodjo, and when news broke on the morning of the elections that Kodjo was leading in the polls it is reported that both were put under house arrest.

== Conduct ==
In February 2020 the Committee to Protect Journalists published a letter urging the Togolese government to refrain from throttling internet service as it had been done in 2017 and 2018, calling it a key danger to the state's democratic process.

The Independent National Electoral Commission was reported to have removed the accreditation of the National Consultation of Civil Society of Togo a key observer group before voting had begun.

On election day the military surrounded Kodjo's home following reports that he was leading the count.

After observing the elections, ECOWAS determined that they were free and transparent, commending the population for its peaceful participation as an improvement from protests years prior against the long reign of the Gnassingbe family. However, sporadic internet shutdowns were recorded across the capital and other major cities, prompting both international watchdogs and opposition parties to question the results.

== Results ==
Candidate	Party	Votes	%
Faure Gnassingbé	Union for the Republic	1,760,309	70.78
Agbéyomé Kodjo	Patriotic Movement for Democracy and Development	483,926	19.46
Jean-Pierre Fabre	National Alliance for Change	116,336	4.68
Aimé Gogué	Alliance of Democrats for Integral Development	59,777	2.40
Wolou Komi	Socialist Pact for Renewal	29,791	1.20
Georges Williams Kuessan	Santé du Peuple	19,923	0.80
Tchassona Traoré	Civic Movement for Democracy and Development	16,814	0.68
Total		2,486,876	100.00
Valid votes		2,486,876	89.80
Invalid/blank votes		282,411	10.20
Total votes		2,769,287	100.00
Registered voters/turnout		3,614,056	76.63
Source: Constitutional Court

== Aftermath ==
On 25 February Kodjo filed a petition at the Constitutional Court asking it to overturn the results. Three days later, he and Kpodzro called for public protests, resulting in the military surrounding their homes and the Ministry of Territorial Administration stating that protests would be illegal. Members of the National Assembly responded by accusing Kodjo of planning a coup.
