= Abass Kaboua =

Togolese politician (1962–2026)

Member of the Senate of Togo
- In office 6 March 2025 – 8 April 2026

Member of the National Assembly of Togo

Personal details
- Born: Abass Frédéric Essokowo Kaboua; 27 April 1962
- Died: 8 April 2026 (aged 63) Lomé, Togo
- Party: MRC
- Education: University of Lorraine
- Occupation: Civil servant

Abass Frédéric Essokowo Kaboua (27 April 1962 – 8 April 2026) was a Togolese politician of the Movement of Centrist Republicans (MRC).

== Life and career ==
Born on 27 April 1962, Kaboua attended the University of Lorraine in France and worked as an agronomic engineer. He then worked for the Ministry of Justice of Togo and was a director of study for the penitentiary administration.

Kaboua was the founder and inaugural president of the MRC. He was elected to the National Assembly to represent Danyi-Apéyémé. On 6 March 2025, he took office in the Senate. In office, his public statements generated some controversy, including his comments on the attempted assassination of Senegalese deputy Guy Marius Sagna. As part of his parliamentary service, he donated schoolbooks to his native Danyi Prefecture.

Kaboua died in Lomé on 8 April 2026, at the age of 63.
