= Sambrini Targone =

Togolese politician

Sambrini Targone is a deputy of the opposition party PDP (Democratic Pan-African Party in Togo's National Assembly. He was elected in the Dankpen prefecture (Northern Togo) as part of the rainbow coalition during the 2013 Togolese parliamentary election. Deputy Targone name came out of the shadow in Togo after his infamous June 2014 arrest for crime the Togolese government claims he committed 5 years earlier. Opposition parties consider the arrest as politically motivated and a way to silence a deputy who had taken a seat from the regime's stronghold and increasingly criticism the president in the region. “We fear for tomorrow, for the future of our country. We have been told the head of state is a man of peace, but his actions have nothing to do with peace” said Mr Paul Dodji Apevon, leader of CAR in reaction to Mr Targone arrest. As term of the deputy bail, a Lomé court banned him from traveling to his circonscription in Dankpen prefecture.
