= Parti des Travailleurs =

Parti des Travailleurs may refer to:

- Workers' Party (Algeria)
- Workers' Party (France)
- Workers' Party (Togo)
- Tunisian Workers Party
