= 2005 Togo protests and riots =

2005 Togolese protests
- Date: 25 February 2005 – 29 April 2005
- Location: Togo
- Caused by: Alleged electoral fraud during the 2005 Togolese presidential election; Violence and fraud at polling stations
- Goals: Resignation of President Faure Gnassingbe; Fresh elections; Democracy
- Methods: Demonstrations, Riots
- Result: Protests suppressed by force; 35,000+ Togolese flee to neighboring Benin and Ghana

Casualties
- Death: ~400-500

The 2005 Togo protests and riots were demonstrations and rioting against the results of the presidential election and Faure Gnassingbe's takeover of power. Protests began in February with protesters demanding new elections and the end of the Gnassingbe dynasty. Around 100 were killed before the elections, but after the 2005 Togolese presidential election around 500 protesters were killed by Togolese Armed Forces, assisted by military-trained Rally of the Togolese People (RPT) militias.

== Background ==
Togolese President Gnassingbe Eyadéma died on 5 February 2005, and the Togolese Armed Forces immediately installed his son Faure Gnassingbé as president. The Army Chief of Staff, Zakari Nandja, said this was meant to avoid a power vacuum. The following day on 6 February, President of the National Assembly of Togo Fambaré Ouattara Natchaba, who should have taken over as caretaker leader pending elections in 2 months per the Constitution of Togo, was dismissed and replaced by Faure Gnassingbe. The African Union (AU) described this as "a military coup" with both the AU and ECOWAS imposing sanctions on Togo. The Togolese government initially banned all protests for two months. However, about 1,000 people attended an anti-government rally in Lomé on 11 February 2005.

== Tensions ==
Gnassingbé lifted the government's ban on protests on 18 February and announced that there would be a presidential election in 60 days. Opposition groups called on Gnassingbé to step down and held large protests in Lomé, Aného, Sokodé and Sinkanse. On 25 February, Gnassingbé, citing growing domestic and international pressure, announced he would resign as president, resulting in ECOWAS lifting sanctions. Opposition supporters objected to the appointment of Bonfoh Abass as interim president instead of Fambaré Ouattara Natchaba, accusing Abass of being too close to the Gnassingbé regime.

== Violence and Protests ==
The United Nations estimated that between 400 and 500 people were killed in electoral violence and mass riots. In May 2005, around 35,000 Togolese citizens fled to Benin and Ghana, citing abductions and forced disappearances, which were believed to be politically motivated.

== Casualties ==
The number of casualties is unclear but unofficial results and tallies are being reported. The United Nations and Amnesty International have said that the military killed 150 protesters and the security forces and police killed 400 protesters. Government officials report that there are 22 deaths but opposition figures suggested there were 150-200 deaths. It is still unclear to this day about the casualties.

== Aftermath ==
Protesters have been describing the fear they've been living in for years and years after the protests. Anger is still growing on the streets. As of now, an investigation into the violence in Togo has been put in place and protests are banned.

== See also ==
- 1992 Togolese constitutional referendum
- Gnassingbe Eyadema
- 2005 Togolese presidential election
