= 2022 Women's March =

Series of protests that occurred after overturn of Roe v. Wade

On May 2, 2022, a series of protests erupted in the United States following the leak of a U.S. Supreme Court document, revealing the possible overturn of Roe v. Wade, a law protecting the right to abortion in the United States. Soon after, a Women's March took place on May 3, 2022, and then again on May 14, 2022, as part of the 2022 abortion rights protests in the United States. These protests have demanded an immediate protection to Roe v. Wade, an end to domestic violence and violence against women, and for an end of sexism in the United States. Counter protests have also taken place but on a much smaller scale.

== Background ==
For years, the topic of abortion had been widely debated, and following the presidency of Donald Trump it became more widely known, with tensions rising between supporters and opponents of abortion rights. This resulted in large scale protests and counter protests, most notably The 2017 Women's March, where more than 5 million protesters took the streets across the country; this was followed by similar protests annually.

On May 2, 2022, following the leak of a possible overturn of Roe v. Wade, protests erupted in Washington, D.C. The following day, a national day of action was announced by Women's March. Thousands took to the streets across the country, most notably in Chicago, Los Angeles, New York City, and Washington, D.C.

On May 14, 2022, hundreds of thousands took to the streets across the United States and internationally. Both protests on May 3 and May 14 are part of the 2022 abortion rights protests in the United States, and were the beginning of a "Summer of Rage" according to Women's March on Facebook.

== National day of action ==
On May 3, 2022, a national day of action was held across the United States at 5 PM local time. Over 50,000 protesters took to the streets across the country, most notably in Boston. Chicago. Los Angeles, New York City, and Washington, D.C. Protests remained largely peaceful; however, clashes with police broke out in some cities.

In Los Angeles, over 2,000 began protesting outside Los Angeles City Hall. Iater in the day, a clash broke out with police resulting in several arrests. In Boston, 1,000 gathered outside the Massachusetts State House, up to 200 college students marched to Worcester's city hall, hundreds marched in Northampton, a dozen gathered outside the town hall in Ayer, and protests also occurred Springfield, Amherst, and Hyannis.

In Maine, up to 300 marched through downtown Portland, and about 50 gathered at an intersection in Bangor. In New York City, almost 5,000 protesters rallied at Foley Square in Manhattan. In Washington, D.C., up to 7,000 people gather outside the Supreme Court of the United States for the second day in a row.
