= Alliance of Democrats for Integral Development =

Political party in Togo

The Alliance of Democrats for Integral Development (French: Alliance des Démocrates pour le Développement Intégral, ADDI) is a political party in Togo.

== History ==
The ADDI was established on 3 October 1991. It did not contest the 2002 parliamentary elections as it was part of the Coalition of Democratic Forces, which called for a boycott. It supported Emmanuel Bob-Akitani of the Union of Forces for Change in the 2005 presidential elections, in which he received 38.1% of the vote.

The party participated in the 2007 parliamentary election; it received less than 1% of the vote, failing to win a seat in the National Assembly. Prior to the 2013 elections it joined the Save Togo Collective; the alliance received 29% of the vote and won 19 seats.

The ADDI nominated Tchaboure Gogue as its candidate for the 2015 presidential elections. He finished third in a field of five candidates with 4% of the vote.
