= Let's Save Togo Collective =

Let's Save Togo Collective Sauvons le Togo (French)
- Abbreviation: CST
- Leader: Ata Messan Ajavon Zeus
- Founded: 4 April 2012
- Headquarters: Boîte Postale 1202 Lomé
- Membership: 54,987
- Ideology: Big tent Factions: Social democracy Progressivism; Anti-authoritarianism; Socialism; Communism; Trotskyism
- Political position: Center-left to far-left
- National Assembly: 0 / 91

The Let's Save Togo Collective (French: Collectif Sauvons le Togo, CST) is a political alliance in Togo.

== History ==
The alliance was established in 2012, consists of the Alliance of Democrats for Integral Development (ADDI), National Alliance for Change (ANC), the Organisation to Build a United Togo, the Socialist Pact for Renewal, the Movement of Centrist Republicans and the Workers' Party.

In August 2012, inspired by the 2003 Liberian sex strike, the collective asked women to abstain from sex for a week as a protest against President Faure Gnassingbé, whose family has been in power for more than 45 years. The strike aimed to "motivate men who are not involved in the political movement to pursue its goals". Opposition leader Isabelle Ameganvi views it as a possible "weapon of the battle" to achieve political change.

In the 2013 parliamentary elections it received 29% of the vote, winning 19 of the 91 seats in the National Assembly. The ANC took 16 seats and the ADDI three.

== Election results ==
=== Parliamentary election ===
| Date | Votes | | | Seats | |
| Date | # | % | ± pp | # | ± |
|---|---|---|---|---|---|
| 2013 | 544,592 | 28.9 % | +28.9 | 19 / 91 | New |

== See also ==
- Category:Let's Save Togo Collective politicians
