= Sex strike =

Strike in which one or more persons refrain from sex

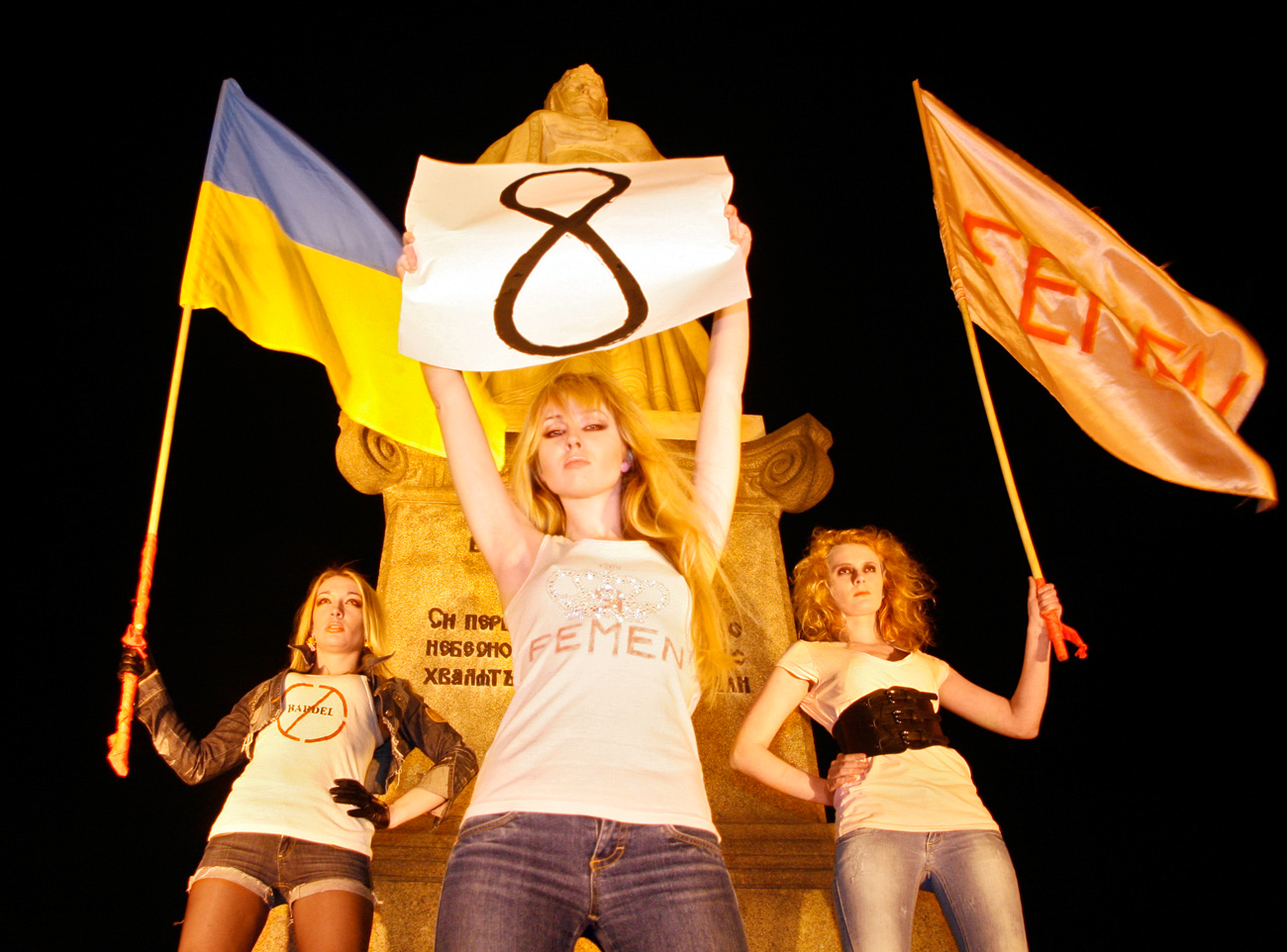
Ukrainian activist group Femen calling for a sex strike to protest against the sexual exploitation of women.

A sex strike (sex boycott), more formally known as Lysistratic nonaction (a reference to the Ancient Greek comedy Lysistrata), is a method of nonviolent resistance in which one or more persons refrain from or refuse sex with partners until policy or social demands are met. It is a form of temporary sexual abstinence. Sex strikes have been used to protest many issues, from war to gang violence to policies.

The effectiveness of sex strikes is contested.

== Historic examples ==
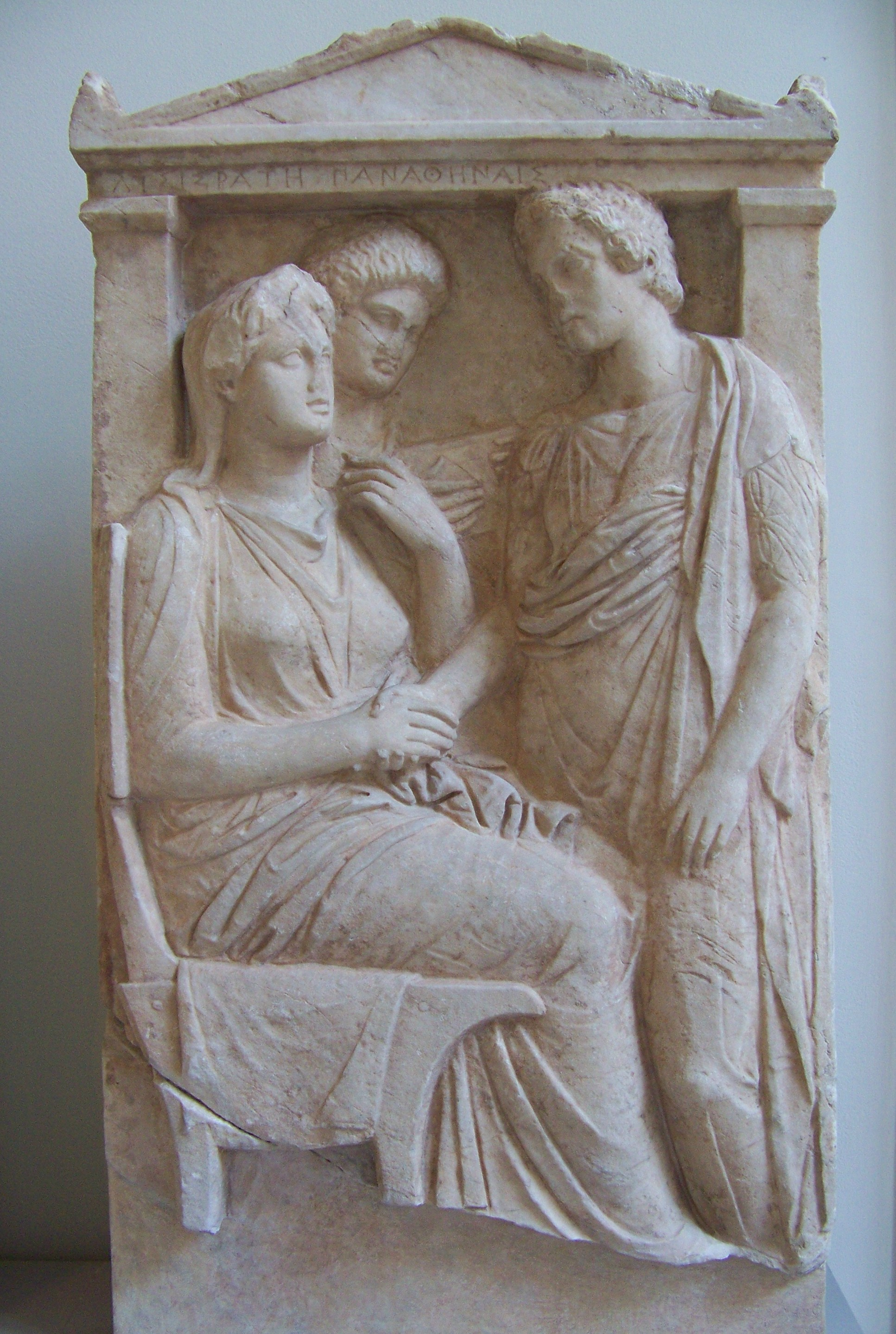
Marble stele of Lysistrate

=== Pre-history ===
Citing similar examples of women's strike action in hunter-gatherer and other precolonial traditions around the world, some anthropologists argue that it was thanks to solidarity of this kind—especially collective resistance to the possibility of rape—that language, culture, and religion became established in our species in the first instance. This controversial hypothesis is known as the "Female Cosmetic Coalitions", "Lysistrata", or "sex strike" theory of human origins.

=== Ancient Greece ===
The most famous example of a sex strike in the arts is the Greek playwright Aristophanes' work Lysistrata, an anti-war comedy. The female characters in the play, led by the eponymous Lysistrata, withhold sex from their husbands as part of their strategy to end the Peloponnesian War.

=== Pre-colonial Nigeria ===
Among the Igbo people of Nigeria, in pre-colonial times, the community of women periodically formed themselves into a Council, a kind of women's trade union. This was headed by the Agba Ekwe, 'the favoured one of the goddess Idemili and her earthly manifestation'. She carried her staff of authority and had the final word in public gatherings and assemblies. Central among her tasks was to ensure men's good behaviour, punishing male attempts at harassment or abuse. What men most feared was the council's power of strike action. According to Ifi Amadiume, an Igbo anthropologist: "The strongest weapon the Council had and used against the men was the right to order mass strikes and demonstrations by all women. When ordered to strike, women refused to perform their expected duties and roles, including all domestic, sexual and maternal services. They would leave the town en masse, carrying only suckling babies. If angry enough, they were known to attack any men they met."

== Modern examples ==
=== Colombia ===
In October 1997, the chief of the Military of Colombia, General Manuel Bonnet publicly called for a sex strike among the wives and girlfriends of the Colombian left-wing guerrillas, drug traffickers, and paramilitaries as part of a strategy—along with diplomacy—to achieve a ceasefire. Also the mayor of Bogotá, Antanas Mockus, declared the capital a women-only zone for one night, suggesting men to stay at home to reflect on violence. The guerrillas ridiculed the initiatives, pointing at the fact that there were more than 2,000 women in their army. In the end the ceasefire was achieved, but lasted only a short time.

In September 2006 dozens of wives and girlfriends of gang members from Pereira, Colombia, started a sex strike called La huelga de las piernas cruzadas ("the strike of crossed legs") to curb gang violence, in response to 480 deaths due to gang violence in the coffee region. According to spokeswoman Jennifer Bayer, the specific target of the strike was to force gang members to turn in their weapons in compliance with the law. According to them, many gang members were involved in violent crime for status and sexual attractiveness, and the strike sent the message that refusing to turn in the guns was not sexy. In 2010 the city's murder rate saw the steepest decline in Colombia, down by 26.5%.

In June 2011, women organized in the so-called Crossed Legs Movement in the secluded town of Barbacoas in southwestern Colombia, started a sex strike to pressure the government to repair the road connecting Barbacoas and its neighboring towns and cities. They declared that if the men of the town were not going to demand action, they would refuse to have sex with them. The men of Barbacoas showed no support at the beginning of the campaign, but they soon joined in the protest campaign. After 112 days strike in October 2011, the Colombian government promised action on road repairs. Construction ensued and the strike ended.

=== Italy ===
In the build-up to New Year's Eve in 2008, hundreds of Neapolitan women pledged to make their husbands and lovers "sleep on the sofa" unless they took action to prevent fireworks from causing serious injuries.

=== Kenya ===
In April 2009 a group of Kenyan women organised a week-long sex strike aimed at politicians, encouraging the wives of the president and prime minister to join in too, and offering to pay prostitutes for lost earnings if they joined in.

=== Liberia ===
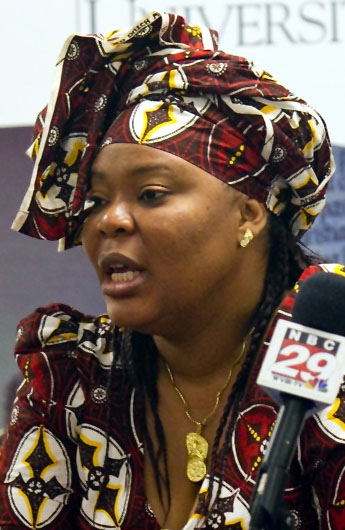
Leymah Gbowee, awarded with 2011 Nobel Peace Prize

In 2003 Leymah Gbowee and the Women of Liberia Mass Action for Peace organized non-violent protests that included suggesting a sex strike, though this was not actually carried out. Their actions led to peace in Liberia after a 14‑year civil war and the election of Ellen Johnson Sirleaf, country's first female head of state. Leymah Gbowee was awarded the 2011 Nobel Peace Prize "for her non-violent struggle for the safety of women and for women's rights to full participation in peace-building work."

=== Philippines ===
During the summer of 2011, women in rural Mindanao imposed a several-week-long sex strike in an attempt to end fighting between their two villages.

=== South Sudan ===
In October 2014, Pricilla Nanyang, a politician in South Sudan, coordinated a meeting of women peace activists in Juba "to advance the cause of peace, healing and reconciliation." Attendees issued a statement which called on women of South Sudan "to deny their husbands conjugal rights until they ensure that peace returns."

=== Togo ===
In 2012, inspired by the 2003 Liberian sex strike, the Togolese opposition coalition "Let's Save Togo" asked women to abstain from sex for a week as a protest against President Faure Gnassingbé, whose family has been in power for more than 45 years. The strike aimed to "motivate men who are not involved in the political movement to pursue its goals". Opposition leader Isabelle Ameganvi views it as a possible "weapon of the battle" to achieve political change.

=== United States ===
In 2019, Georgia governor, Brian Kemp (R), signed House Bill (HB) 481 into law. It was immediately blocked by a lawsuit. HB 481 criminalizes most abortions after six weeks and adds a “fetal personhood” language. This language changes the definition of a “natural person” to include an unborn child at any stage of development in the womb. This law has been nicknamed a “heartbeat bill” because HB 481 states that no abortion will be performed if the physician determines that they detect a human heartbeat.

In response to this bill's passage, actress and #MeToo activist, Alyssa Milano and Waleisah Wilson wrote an opinion editorial for CNN and went to Twitter to call for a sex strike until the policy was repealed. In the tweet, Milano calls on women to join her sex strike until women “have legal control over [their] own bodies” because women cannot risk a pregnancy under this new bill. In her CNN opinion piece, Milano states that there are similar bills to the one in Georgia and that the single purpose of them is to make it up to the Supreme Court, forcing them reconsider Roe v. Wade (1973). In this opinion piece, Milano discusses the history of Lysistratic protest, calls on people who can become pregnant to conduct a sex strike, and pay attention to current events. Milano encourages a sex strike in addition to other efforts.

== In entertainment ==
- Lysistrata
- Absurdistan (film)
- Chi-Raq (film)

== See also ==
- 2021 Minas Gerais prostitute strike
- Matriarchy
- Menstrual synchrony
- Occupation of Saint-Nizier church by Lyon prostitutes
- Reproductive synchrony
- Sex/Work Strike
- Women's strike (disambiguation)
- Female cosmetic coalitions
- 4B movement
