= Africa 24 =

Television news channel

- Broadcast area: Africa
- Headquarters: Nairobi, Kenya

Programming
- Language: French
- Picture format: 1080p HDTV (downscaled to 16:9 576i for SDTV feed)

Ownership
- Sister channels: Africa 24 Sport; Africa 24 Infinity; Africa 24 English

History
- Launched: 2009

Links
- Website: www.africa24tv.com

Africa 24 is a 24/7 television news network devoted to news about Africa. It broadcasts in French to France, but is also available in Sub-Saharan Africa. In January 2013, Arab Satellite Communications Organization (Arabsat) announced that it would be making Africa 24 available to satellite subscribers in the Middle East and North Africa, intending to reach an audience of immigrants to the region from Sub-Saharan Africa.

== Programming ==
Launched in 2009, Africa 24 is comparable with the United States-based news network CNN, Britain's BBC World News, France's France 24, the pan-European Euronews, Germany's Deutsche Welle, and Arab- and English-language news broadcaster Al Jazeera. The Africa 24 network also broadcasts some news programming on its website. Some core programming broadcast by Africa24 includes Journal Télévisé (JT), the evening summary of the day's news; Talks, a politics- and economics-oriented program that includes debates on current affairs topics; Sport, covering sports news across Africa; and Magazine, a cultural affairs program.

== Development ==
Africa 24 was founded by Constant Nemale, President of the company Afrimédia SA, based in Saint-Cloud, France. Africa 24 accounts for a large part of the Holding S.A. Afrimédia International, headquartered in Luxembourg. 20% of this company is owned by the Republic of Equatorial Guinea and, as of 2012, the Republic of Cameroon. AFRIMEDIA has offered its stock to many other African states.

Afrimedia France, editorial administrators of Africa 24, employed 94 staff in 2012. Two unions are officially present at the company.

== Believe in Africa ==
In 2011, they launched the commercial label "Believe in Africa" with the support of their partners and multinational companies. The "Believe in Africa" label is aimed to support African businesses by boosting confidence in the quality of their workmanship. The label is based on the now internationally known Made in China label on the back of goods.

== The African News Room ==
Every weekday evening, Africa 24 broadcasts a segment called the Africa News Room. The program starts at 17:30 GMT and ends at 18:30. The program is presented by Marie Angèle Toure and Khadija Sfar. Africa News Room themes include economy, politics, education, health and society.

== The Talk ==
The Talk is a segment of Africa 24 where the host Babylas Boton interviews African political, economic and social personalities. Ministers, writers, historians, economists and investors in Africa have appeared. One of the most famous people to appear on "The Talk" is the President of the National Assembly of Côte d'Ivoire, Mamadou Koulibaly.
