= Agbagli Kossi =

Togolese sculptor (1935–1991)

- Born: Agbagli Kossi; 1935; Bè, Lomé, Togo
- Died: 1991 (aged 55–56)
- Known for: Vodun figures; Venavi statuettes
- Movement: West African Vodun art

Agbagli Kossi (1935–1991) was a Togolese sculptor, whose work was representative of the West African Vodun art tradition.

== Background ==
He was born in Bè, a district of Lomé, and became an eminent figure among the vodou circles of Togo. He was particularly noted for his little wooden voodoo figures, painted mostly with pink lacquer, and occasionally white. He produced many examples of statuettes of twins, and children with their mothers, known as venavi.

Kossi exhibited at the Magiciens de la terre exhibition at the Centre Georges Pompidou in Paris in 1989 and in 1991 his work was shown at an exhibition in Centro Atlántico de Arte Moderno, in Las Palmas de Gran Canaria, Spain. In 2008, his work appeared at the Mami Wata: Arts for Water Spirits in Africa and Its Diasporas showcasing at the Fowler Museum of UCLA in Los Angeles. Today, his work is represented in The Contemporary African Art Collection (CAAC).
