= 2019 Swiss women's strike =

The 2019 Swiss women's strike (German: Frauenstreik, French: Grève des Femmes) was a nationwide feminist strike action that took place in Switzerland on 14 June 2019. An estimated 500,000 people participated across the country, making it one of the largest demonstrations in recent Swiss history.

The strike was held exactly 28 years after the 1991 Swiss women's strike. Protesters demanded equal pay, recognition of unpaid care work, protection from sexual and physical harassment, and greater representation in government. Demonstrations took place in major cities including Bern, Zurich, Basel, Geneva, and Lausanne, with participants wearing purple—a color associated with women's suffrage movements—and displaying the female symbol ♀ with a raised fist.

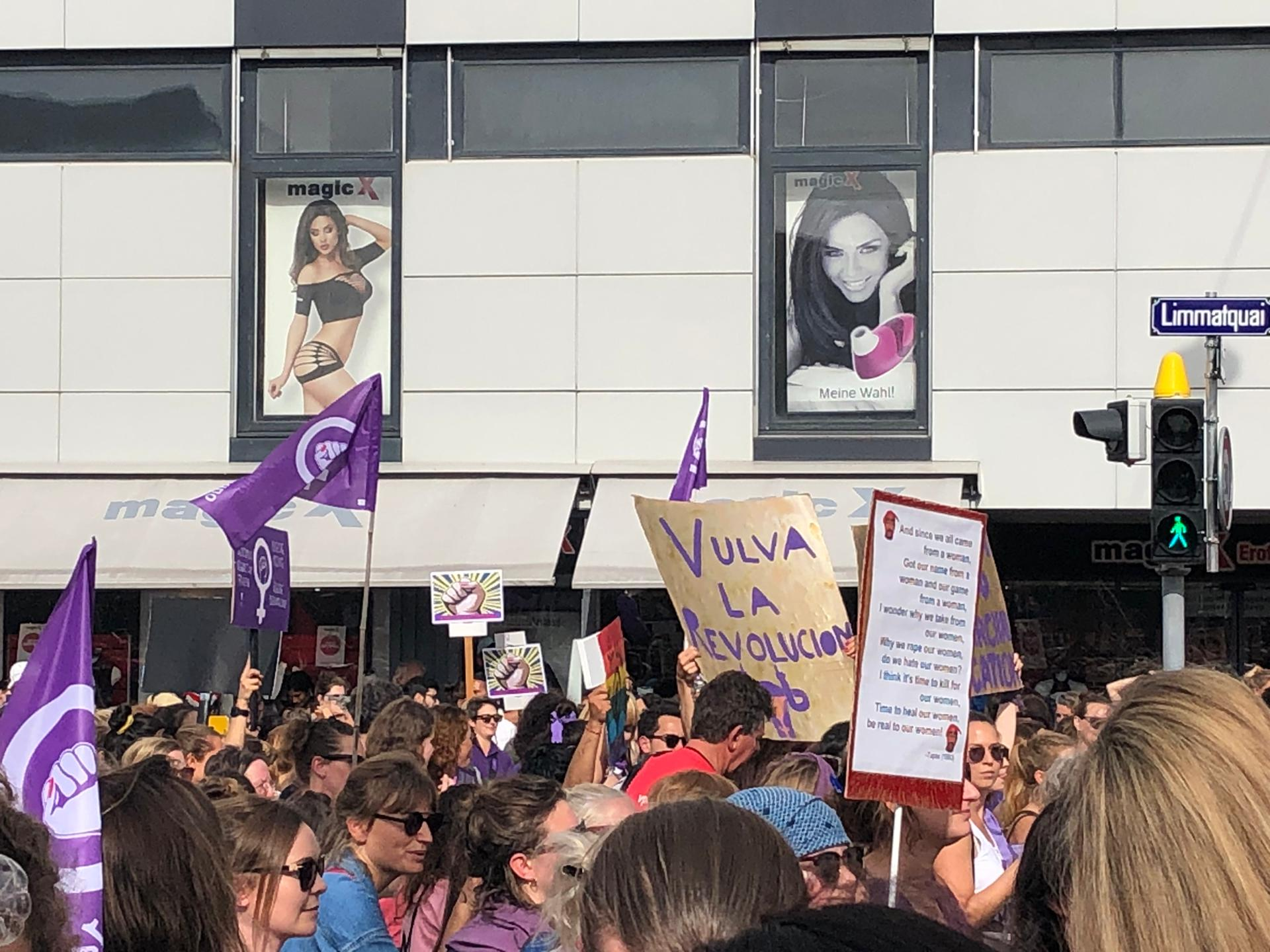
Women marching down the streets of Zurich with purple flags

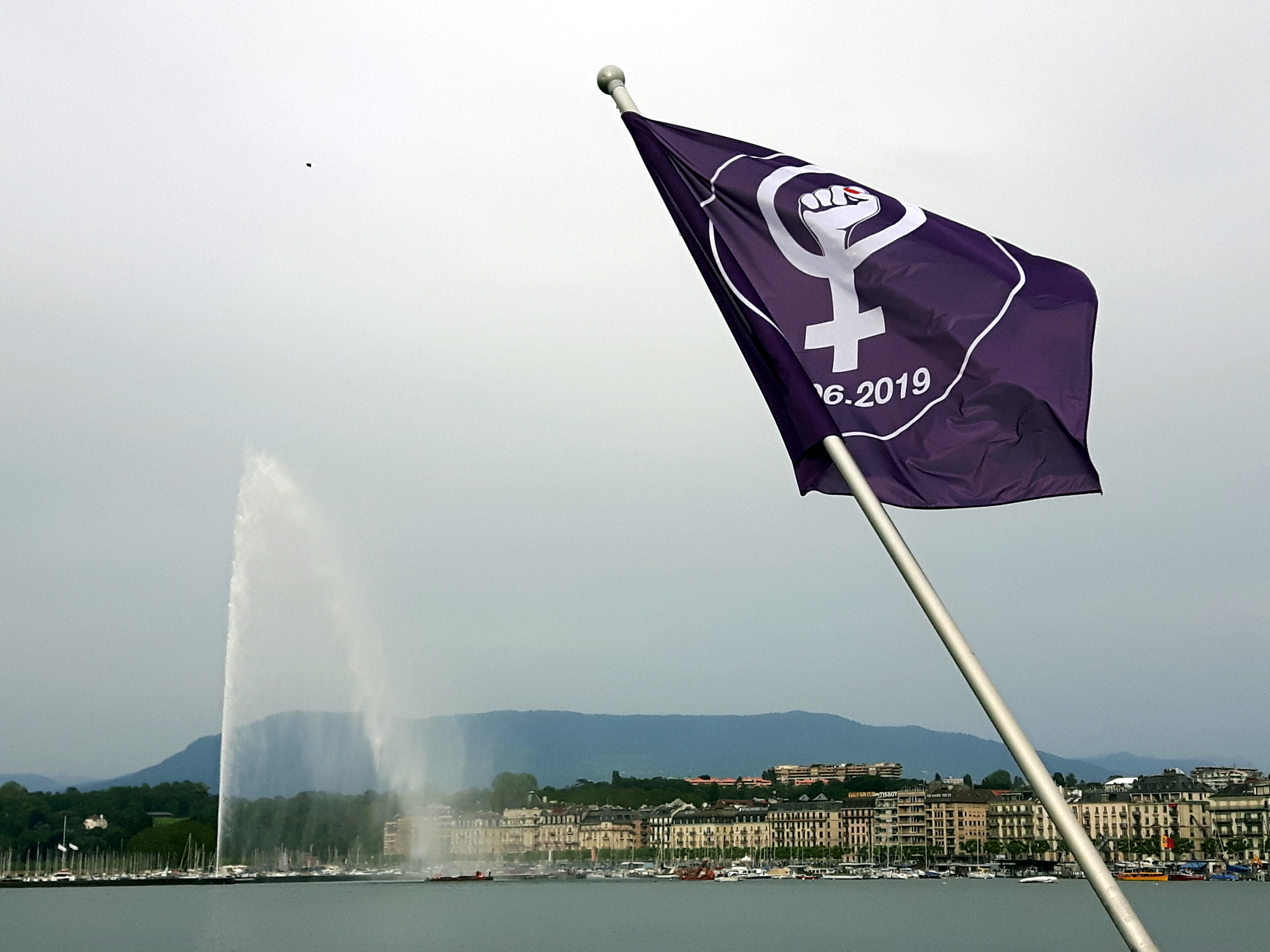
Purple flag with female symbol and raised fist in Geneva

== Background ==
=== Gender inequality in Switzerland ===
At the time of the 2019 strike, Switzerland faced significant gender disparities across multiple areas. According to the Federal Statistical Office, women earned on average 19% less than men in 2018, with 45.4% of this wage gap remaining unexplained by structural factors such as position, experience, or education. The median wage gap was 11.5%.

Women also bore a disproportionate burden of unpaid domestic work, dedicating 28 hours per week to household tasks compared to 18 hours for men, according to 2016 data. This inequality contributed to higher poverty rates among women (8.5%) than men (6.5%). A 2019 survey found that 22% of Swiss women aged 16 and older had experienced non-consensual sexual acts.

=== Legislative context ===
The 2019 strike was partly organized in response to the 2018 revision of Switzerland's 1996 Federal Act on Gender Equality, which trade unions criticized for failing to include sanctions for wage discrimination. This legislative disappointment helped galvanize support for renewed protest action.

The strike also occurred within the context of international feminist movements, including the Women's March in the United States, Spain's feminist strikes, and the Me Too movement.

== History and precedents ==
The 2019 strike built upon a long history of Swiss women's rights activism:

- 1928, 1958: Swiss exhibitions for Women's Work (SAFFA) highlighted women's economic contributions
- 1959: Introduction of women's voting rights in Vaud and Neuchâtel cantons
- 1971: Swiss women gained federal voting rights, among the last in Europe
- 1981: Gender equality was enshrined in the Swiss Constitution on 14 June
- 1985: Women gained the right to work and open bank accounts without spousal permission
- 1991: The first women's strike on 14 June involved approximately 500,000 participants
- 1996: Federal Act on Gender Equality was enacted
- 2002: Decriminalization of abortion for up to 12 weeks after pregnancy
- 2005: Maternity leave was introduced

The choice of 14 June as the strike date honored both the 1991 strike and the 1981 constitutional amendment on gender equality.

== Organization and preparation ==
Planning for the 2019 strike began in January 2018, when the Women's Congress of the Swiss Trade Union Federation passed a resolution supporting a new women's strike. Feminist Assemblies held in Lausanne on 2 June 2018 formally approved the strike principle, launching a year-long campaign.

On 22 September 2018, approximately 20,000 people demonstrated in Bern for wage equality, building momentum for the June 2019 action. Organizers published a manifesto in January 2019 outlining 19 points justifying the strike.

The strike was coordinated by various cantonal, regional, and local collectives across Switzerland, united under the slogan "Equality. Full stop!" (German: Gleichberechtigung. Punkt. Schluss!).

== Events of 14 June 2019 ==
The strike featured two coordinated national moments: at 11:00 AM, the call for strike was read simultaneously across Swiss cities, and at 3:24 PM, women were invited to leave their workplaces or homes. The 3:24 PM timing symbolically represented when women effectively stop being paid during an eight-hour workday, based on the wage gap calculated by federal statistics.

In major cities, demonstrations took various forms. In Bern, members of parliament interrupted their session for 15 minutes in symbolic support, with many joining protesters in the Federal Square. Protesters wore purple clothing and carried signs with the female symbol ♀ containing a raised fist. Some controversial symbols were also displayed, including representations of female anatomy, which organizers described as powerful symbols of femininity.

The day concluded at midnight when Lausanne Cathedral was illuminated in purple, serving as a final symbolic gesture.

=== Participation by city ===
Estimates of participation varied, with organizers and police sometimes providing different figures:

- Basel: 40,000 people
- Bern: 50,000 people
- Geneva: 20,000 (police estimate) to 75,000 (algorithm-based count by EPFL)
- Lausanne: 40,000 (police) to 60,000 (organizers)
- Zurich: 160,000 (revised police estimate)
- Smaller cities: Aarau (3,000), Delémont (4,000), Fribourg (12,000), Neuchâtel (5,000), Sion (12,000), St. Gallen (4,000)
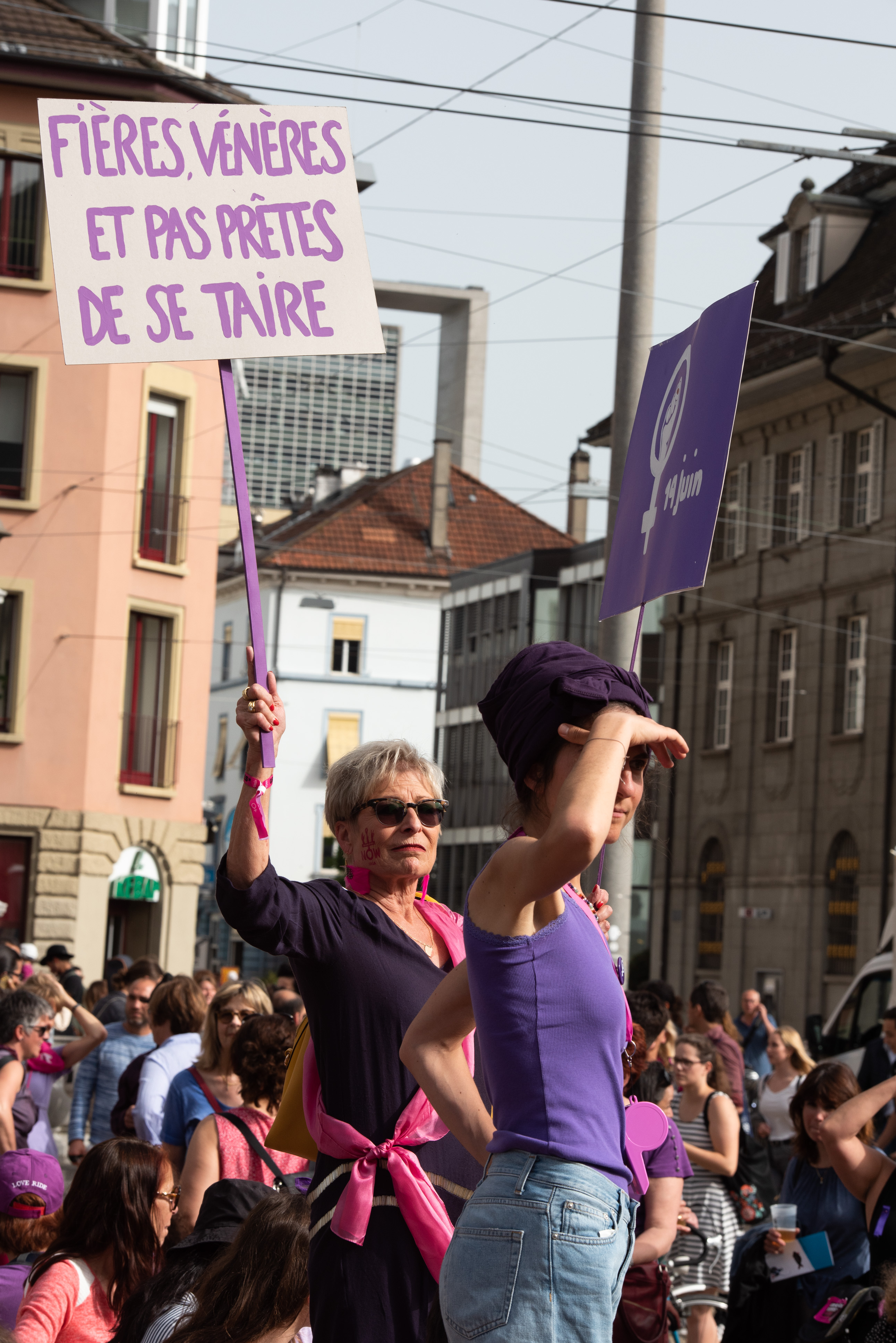
  Demonstration in Biel/Bienne, with women holding up signs.

== Influence ==
In the 2019 federal elections, women's representation in the National Council reached a historic high of 42%, compared to 32% in 2015. The parties electing the highest proportion of women were the Social Democratic Party (62%) and the Green Party (61%).

The Swiss Parliament introduced two-week paternity leave, expanding from the previous single day. Despite opposition from the Swiss People's Party and some members of other parties, Swiss voters approved the paternity leave by 60.3% in a referendum on 27 September 2020, with the policy taking effect on 1 January 2021.

The success of the 2019 strike established 14 June as an annual day of feminist action in Switzerland. Subsequent strikes were held in 2020 (despite the COVID-19 pandemic), 2021, 2022, and 2023, maintaining the date as a fixture in Swiss feminist activism and permanently transforming the country's feminist landscape.
