= Ata Messan Ajavon Zeus =

Togolese politician

Ata Messan Ajavon Zeus is a Togolese politician, and has been the chairman of the Save Togo Collective since the party was founded.

Political offices
Preceded by None	Leader of the Save Togo Collective; 2012–present	Succeeded by incumbent
