= Isabelle Ameganvi =

Togolese lawyer and politician

- Born: 3 September 1961 (age 64); Kpalimé, Togo
- Occupations: lawyer, politician
- Known for: Let's Save Togo

Isabelle Djibgodi Améganvi Manavi (3 September 1961) born in Kpalimé, Togo, is a Togolese lawyer and politician. She was elected to Togo's parliament in 2007. She is well-known for orchestrating a sex strike in August 2012, protesting electoral reforms that favored the party in power. In 2013, she was elected to the National Assembly a second time.

== Early life and legal career ==
Améganvi was born on 3 September 1961 in the town of Kpalimé, Togo, the sixth of eight children. She received her primary education at the Evangelical School Hanoukopé. She enrolled at the collège Notre Dame des Apôtre and the Tokoin Lycée in Lomé, Togo's capital. Afterwards, she studied at Lycée Jean-Baptiste Say in Paris, France, and received her degree in 1983. Améganvi earned a law degree at Paris I University in 1989 and a master of law at the University of Benin the following year.

Améganvi was a trainee lawyer under Ahlin K. Komlan in Lomé from 1994 to 1996. In February 1997, she was called to the bar in Togo. As a lawyer, she represented students, political prisoners, journalists, trade unionists and other human rights activists. In the 1990s, she joined the Togolese League of Human Rights and the Collective of Associations of Women. Ameganvi later served on the legal committee of the Evangelical Presbyterian Church of Togo.

== Political career ==
She was elected to the National Assembly of Togo in the 2007 parliamentary election, representing the Union of Forces for Change (UFC). However, in 2010 she was arbitrarily excluded from the party and lost her seat in the assembly. She is the leader of the women's rights division of the group Let's Save Togo, an alliance of nine civil society groups and seven opposition parties and movements.

At a rally on 26 August 2012, attended by thousands of people, she called the women of Togo to a week-long sex-strike against recent electoral reforms, which would make it easier for the ruling president Faure Gnassingbe's party to win re‑election in the parliamentary polls scheduled for October 2012. The Gnassingbe family has ruled Togo for 45 years. She was inspired by the sex strike of Liberian women led by Ellen Johnson Sirleaf, who in 2003 used the tactic to push for peace during wartime.

In addition, Ameganvi encouraged women to dress only in red pants to resist the imprisonment of 120 opposition supporters. "We have power to change things. We do not want to remain in the kitchen, but we can have our say in politics," Ameganvi said. "We cannot stay hand-crossed, as our children and husbands are being kept in jail." She complained that women bore the brunt of Togo’s economic and political problems and were no longer willing to put up with it.

Amenganvi led another demonstration on 20 December 2012 in which she encouraged women to dress up in red. This demonstration was against the precarious economic situation of women in Togo. The color red was chosen because traditionally Togolese women made and sold red garments at markets.

Ameganvi was a board member of the National Alliance for Change (ANC). In June 2013, she resigned from the ANC. Ameganvi cited the many frustrations and disappointments arising from the establishment of lists of candidates for the upcoming parliamentary election. She joined the Alliance of Democrats for Integral Development (ADDI) for the election and was elected to her parliamentary seat

== Personal life ==
She is a single mother.
