= Pan-African Democratic Party =

Political party in Togo

Pan-African Democratic Party Parti Démocratique Panafricain
- Founded: 2000s
- Ideology: Pan-Africanism
- National Assembly: 0 / 113

The Pan-African Democratic Party (French: Parti Démocratique Panafricain, PDP) is a political party in Togo. The party participated in the October 2007 parliamentary election, but did not win any seats. In 2013 legislative election, Sambrini Targone won the party single seat in the Denkpen prefecture.
