= Women's March =

Women's March may refer to:

- Women's March on Versailles, a 1789 march in Paris
- Women's Sunday, a 1908 suffragette march in London
- Woman Suffrage Procession, a 1913 march and rally in Washington, D.C.
- Women's March (South Africa), a 1956 march in Pretoria, South Africa
- March for Women's Lives, a 2004 march in Washington, D.C.
- Women's Memorial March, an annual event held in Vancouver since 2009

== Post-Trump inauguration marches ==
- 2017 Women's March, a political rally that included marches in Washington, D.C., and subsequently worldwide
  - List of 2017 Women's March locations outside the United States
  - Women's March on Portland
  - Women's March on Seattle
- 2018 Women's March
- 2019 Women's March
- 2020 Women's March
- 2021 Women's March
- 2022 Women's March

== See also ==
- Women's strike
