= Zakari Nandja =

General Zakari Nandja is a Togolese political figure and military officer, serving in the government of Togo as Minister of State for Water, Sanitation, and Village Hydraulics since May 2009. He was Chief of Staff of the Togolese Armed Forces (Forces Armées Togolaises, FAT) prior to his appointment to the government on 17 May 2009; Essofa Ayeva was then appointed to replace him as Chief of Staff.

Nandja's appointment to the government followed the thwarting of an alleged coup plot in April 2009.
