= Movement of Centrist Republicans =

Political party in Togo

The Movement of Centrist Republicans (French: Mouvement des Républicains Centristes, MRC) is a political party in Togo.

== History ==
In the 2007 parliamentary elections the party received 0.1% of the vote and failed to win a seat. It joined the Save Togo Collective prior to the 2013 parliamentary elections. Although the alliance won 19 seats, the MRC did not gain parliamentary representation.
