= Claude Améganvi =

Togolese politician and Trotskyist

Claude Henri Améganvi (born 12 August 1953, Lomé) is a Togolese Trotskyist and former political prisoner. An architect by training, in 1977 he joined the exile student movement in France in opposition to the one-party dictatorship of Gnassingbé Eyadéma. He helped found the Organisation of Togolese Workers for Democracy (OTTD) in 1988. He returned to Togo in 1991 during a period of political liberalisation and was a delegate to the National Conference and subsequently the High Council of the Republic (the transitional parliament). In December 1991 he went into exile again, this time in Benin, until 1997. At the foundation of the Workers' Party (PT) in 1998, Améganvi was selected national coordinator. He remained a strong critic of the regimes of Eyadéma and his son Faure Gnassingbé. In September 2002, he was sentenced to four months in prison for defamation; he allegedly provided a Togolese newspaper the unsubstantiated claim that Forbes magazine had named President Eyadéma one of the world's wealthiest people. The sentence was increased to six months, and Améganvi was released in February 2003.
