= Patriotic Movement for Democracy and Development =

Togolese political party

Patriotic Movement for Democracy and Development Mouvement Patriotique pour la Democratie et la Développement
- Abbreviation: MPDD
- President: Jonas Siliadin
- Founder: Agbéyomé Kodjo
- Colours: Blue
- National Assembly: 0 / 113

The Patriotic Movement for Democracy and Development (French: Mouvement Patriotique pour la Democratie et la Développement, MPDD) is a political party in Togo. It is led by Agbéyomé Kodjo, who stood as the party's candidate for the 2020 Togolese presidential election. As of 2019, it had 2 mayors, 4 deputy mayors, 25 municipal councilors and 2 National assembly members. Its headquarters are located in the Togolese capital Lomé.

During the 2020 Togolese presidential election, Kodjo was supported by former politician and Archbishop Emeritus of Lome Philippe Fanoko Kpodzro. Both Kodjo and Kpodzro were placed under house arrest by Togolese authorities during the election, with external media sources suggesting it was politically motivated. Both men were re-arrested by Togolese gendarmes on April 22 after Kodjo disputed the results of the election. Fifteen MPDD supporters, who were arrested at the same time as Kodjo, were released in August following four months of detention.

== Ideology ==
The party has called for swift constitutional reforms and pledged to fight against corruption in Togo.
