= 2013 Togolese parliamentary election =

- 25 July 2013
- All 91 seats in the National Assembly; 46 seats needed for a majority
- Turnout: 66.06% (▼19.08pp)
Party	Leader	Vote %	Seats	+/–
UNIR	Faure Gnassingbé	46.72	62	+12
CST	Ata Messan Ajavon Zeus	28.89	19	New
CAC	Kafui Adjamagbo-Johnson	10.83	6	+2
UFC	Jean-Pierre Fabre	7.71	3	−24
Independent		0.76	1	+1
This lists parties that won seats. See the complete results below.
Prime Minister before	Prime Minister after
Kwesi Ahoomey-Zunu; UNIR	Kwesi Ahoomey-Zunu; UNIR

Parliamentary elections were held in Togo on 25 July 2013. The ruling Union for the Republic (UNIR) won 62 of the 91 seats in the National Assembly.

== Background ==
Some members of the opposition sought a postponement in order to see electoral reforms take effect prior to the elections, while others sought the repeal of the changes as improperly introduced. Amongst the latter was the controversial gerrymandering of constituency borders in favour UNIR, led by President Faure Gnassingbé, and the 10-seat increase in the number of members of the National Assembly from 81 to 91.

Although the government banned street demonstrations in commercial areas, citing an inability to maintain security and public order, protest organizers from opposition and civil society groups pledged to carry out protests and denounced what they termed an attempt to stifle criticism. Protests organized by the Let's Save Togo Collective were planned for 21–23 August. On the first day, several thousand protesters commenced a march in Lomé's Bè neighbourhood and then headed to the commercial district of Deckon, where 100 police officers were deployed. Trouble then arose amid a dispute as to whether the protest march would end in Deckon for a rally or proceed further. The protesters were then dispersed using tear gas 10 minutes after the march commenced.

The elections were originally scheduled for October 2012, but protests and strikes asking for electoral reforms delayed the process. After being rescheduled for 24 March 2013, they were postponed again, first to 21 July 2013, then to 25 July 2013.

== Electoral system ==
The 91 members of the National Assembly were elected by closed list proportional representation in 30 multi-member constituencies.

== Results ==
Initial results showed a landslide victory for UNIR, which was projected to win 60 out of 91 seats, with the remaining seats distributed among opposition parties. The opposition Union of Forces for Change suffered a defeat, losing most of their 27 seats. The National Alliance for Change (Alliance national pour le changement, ANC) was expected to become the largest opposition party.

Party	Votes	%	Seats	+/–
Union for the Republic	880,608	46.72	62	+12
Save Togo Collective	544,592	28.89	19	New
Rainbow Alliance	204,143	10.83	6	+2
Union of Forces for Change	145,359	7.71	3	–24
Pan-African Patriotic Convergence	15,602	0.83	0	0
New Togolese Commitment	14,225	0.75	0	New
Other parties	66,171	3.51	0	–
Independents	14,360	0.76	1	+1
Total	1,885,060	100.00	91	–
Valid votes	1,891,773	94.06		
Invalid/blank votes	119,430	5.94		
Total votes	2,011,203	100.00		
Registered voters/turnout	3,044,332	66.06		
Source: Adam Carr

== Aftermath ==
When the National Assembly began its new term, Dama Dramani, a UNIR deputy, was elected as President of the National Assembly on 2 September 2013. Opposition deputies boycotted the vote as UNIR was unwilling to give them the posts of first and second vice-president in the Bureau of the National Assembly. Consequently UNIR deputies were elected to all of the 11 posts in the Bureau.
