= Workers' Party (Togo) =

Political party in Togo

Workers' Party Parti des travailleurs
- Leader: Claude Améganvi
- Founded: 1998
- Ideology: Communism; Socialism; Trotskyism
- International affiliation: International Liaison Committee for a Workers' International

Workers' Party (French: Parti des travailleurs, PT) was an opposition Togolese political party founded in 1998. It is of Trotskyist orientation and has links to the trade unions. Claude Améganvi has been the PT's national coordinator since the party's founding. PT is a member of Pierre Lambert's International Liaison Committee for a Workers' International (ILC).
