= 1992 Togolese constitutional referendum =

- 27 September 1992
- Do you approve of the Draft Constitution proposed to you by the Transitional Government?

Results
| Choice | Votes | % |
|---|---|---|
| Yes | 1,436,858 | 99.18% |
| No | 11,942 | 0.82% |
| Valid votes | 1,448,800 | 98.93% |
| Invalid or blank votes | 15,679 | 1.07% |
| Total votes | 1,464,479 | 100.00% |
| Registered voters/turnout | 1,972,676 | 74.24% |

A constitutional referendum was held in Togo on 27 September 1992. The changes to the constitution would restore multi-party democracy and were approved by 99.17% of voters with a 74.2% turnout.

== Results ==
| Choice | Votes | % |
|---|---|---|
| For | 1,436,858 | 99.17 |
| Against | 11,942 | 0.83 |
| Invalid/blank votes | 15,679 | – |
| Total | 1,464,479 | 100 |
| Registered voters/turnout | 1,972,676 | 74.23 |
Source: Direct Democracy
