= Bè =

Neighborhood of Lomé, Togo

Coordinates: 6°08′N 1°15′E

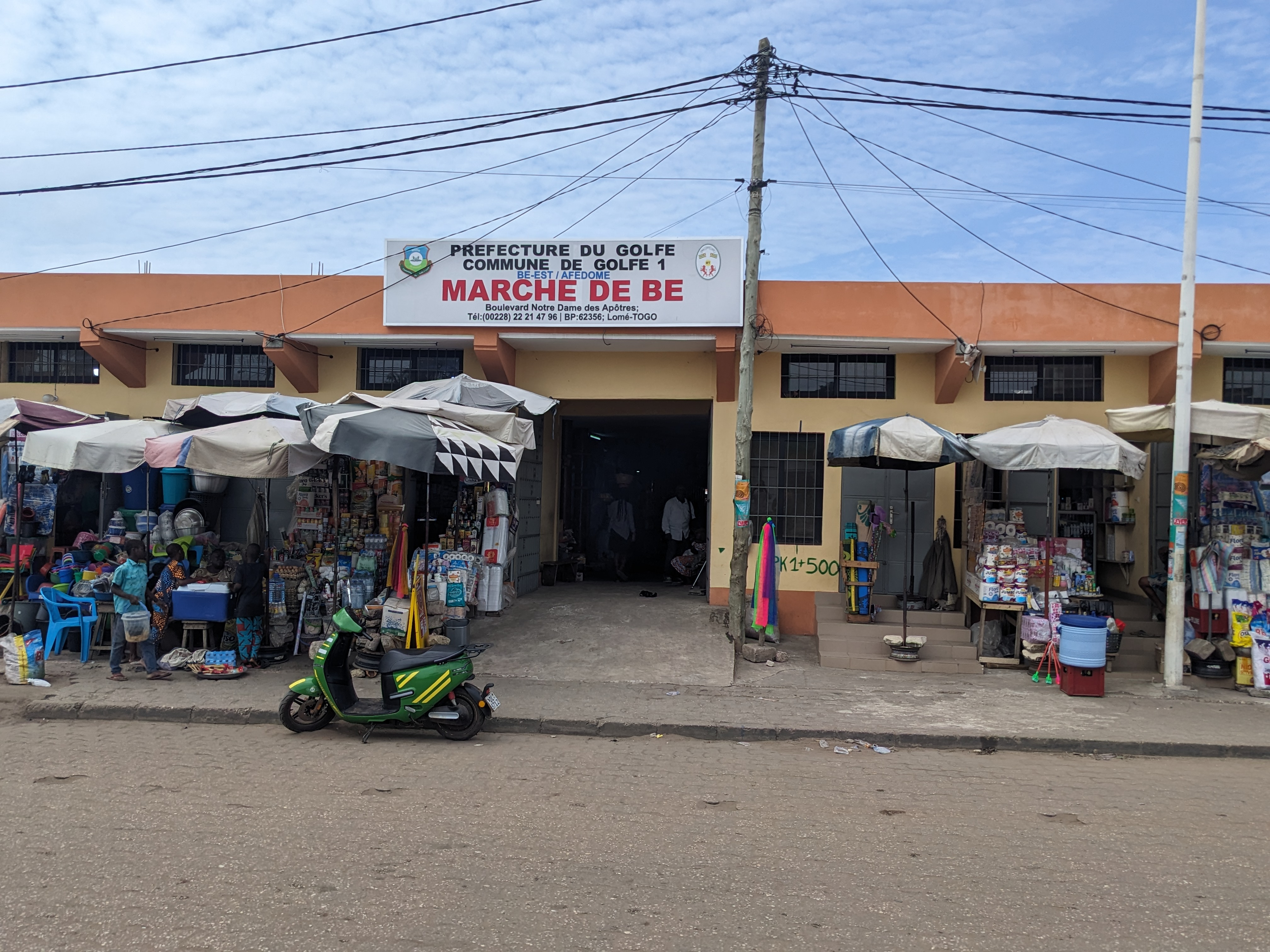
Bè market in Togo, in the maritime region.

Bè (French pronunciation: [bɛ]) is a canton and neighborhood of Lomé, Togo, located on the lagoon, east of the city. It contains a number of hotels and bars.

== Notable people ==
- Agbagli Kossi (1935-1991), sculptor
