= National Alliance for Change =

Political party in Togo

National Alliance for Change Alliance Nationale pour le Changement
- Abbreviation: ANC
- President: Jean-Pierre Fabre
- Secretary-General: Jean-Claude Delava Codjo
- Founder: Jean-Pierre Fabre; Patrick Lawson; Isabelle Ameganvi
- Founded: 10 October 2010
- Split from: Union of Forces for Change
- Headquarters: 51, Rue 73, Quartier Aguiarkomé / BP 1599 Lomé, Togo
- Ideology: Social democracy Progressivism; Anti-authoritarianism
- Political position: Centre-left
- Colours: Orange
- National Assembly: 1 / 113

Website
- www.anctogo.com

The National Alliance for Change (French: Alliance Nationale pour le Changement, abbreviated ANC) is a social-democratic party in Togo, led by Jean-Pierre Fabre. The party emerged from a split within the Union of Forces for Change (UFC) following the 2010 Togolese presidential election.
