= Jacques Amouzou =

Togolese politician and businessman

Kwame-Mensah Jacques Amouzou (born 25 July 1936) is a Togolese politician and businessman. An ethnic Ewe, Amouzou was a minor candidate in both the 1993 and 1998 presidential elections. He is the President of the Union of Independent Liberals (ULI). Amouzou was "widely perceived as a front" for President Gnassingbé Eyadéma during the 1990s.

== Political career ==
Amouzou was born in Gbatope, located in Zio Prefecture. At the time of the August 1993 presidential election, Amouzou ran as an independent candidate. He and Ife Adani were the only candidates to stand against President Eyadéma, who won 96% of the vote. Amouzou and Adani were not considered serious challengers; all of the major opposition leaders chose to boycott the election.

Led by Amouzou, the ULI was founded in November 1993 as a moderate opposition party, representing the political space between Eyadéma's Rally of the Togolese People (RPT) and the radical opposition Collective of Democratic Opposition-2 (COD-2). In the February 1994 parliamentary election, he ran as a candidate in Zio Prefecture, but did not win a seat.

Amouzou and the ULI were viewed as close to the RPT, and Amouzou was described as "virtually a second RPT candidate" at the time of the 1998 presidential election; his critics alleged that he was merely a tool of Eyadéma who was used to manipulate the political playing field in Eyadéma's favor. He placed last in the 1998 election with 0.35% of the vote.
