= Kwassi Klutse =

Togolese politician and Prime Minister (1945–2024)

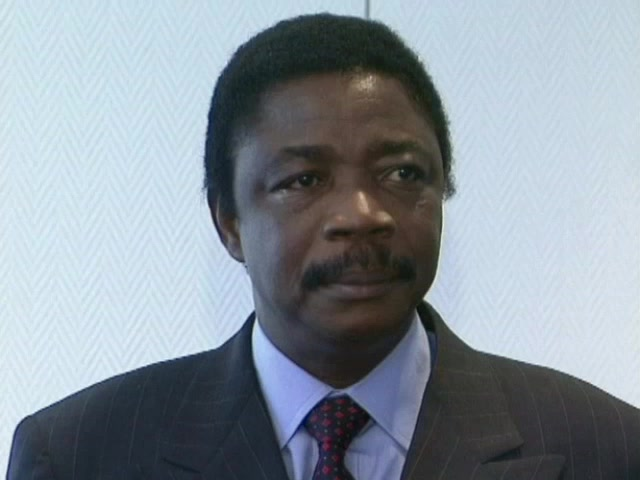

4th Prime Minister of Togo
- In office 20 August 1996 – 21 May 1999
- President: Gnassingbé Eyadéma
- Preceded by: Edem Kodjo
- Succeeded by: Eugène Koffi Adoboli

Personal details
- Born: 29 July 1945 Agbélouvé, French Togoland
- Died: 19 May 2024 (aged 78)
- Party: Rally of the Togolese People

Kwassi Klutse (29 July 1945 – 19 May 2024) was a Togolese politician who was the prime minister of Togo from 20 August 1996 to 21 May 1999.

== Life and career ==
Klutse was born in Agbélouvé, French Togoland (now in Zio Prefecture) on 29 July 1945. After working as an official at the Ministry of Planning from 1977 to 1995, he was appointed to the government of Prime Minister Edem Kodjo as Minister of Planning and Territorial Development on 29 November 1995. Subsequently, in by-elections that were held in constituencies where the results of the 1994 parliamentary election had been annulled, the Rally of the Togolese People (RPT) of President Gnassingbé Eyadéma won all three constituencies at stake, giving it and its allies a parliamentary majority and enabling it to form a new government without relying on Kodjo's Togolese Union for Democracy (UTD) party. Klutse was then appointed Prime Minister by Eyadéma on 20 August 1996.

Previously not a member of a political party, in 1997 Klutse joined the RPT and became a member of its Political Bureau. On 19 August 1998, Eyadéma accepted the resignation of Klutse and his government, but he reappointed Klutse on 20 August to head a new government, which was named on 1 September. The opposition refused to participate in this government, and Klutse, speaking on television, "deplore[d] that the sincere and brotherly hand extended by the president was not accepted by the leaders of the opposition".

In the March 1999 parliamentary election, Klutse was elected to the National Assembly as the RPT candidate in the First Constituency of Zio Prefecture; he was unopposed and won the seat with 100% of the vote. He and his government resigned on 17 April 1999; Eyadéma accepted the resignation, and Klutse's government remained temporarily in office in a caretaker capacity. Eyadéma appointed Eugène Koffi Adoboli as Klutse's successor on 21 May 1999.

Klutse was re-elected to the National Assembly in the October 2002 parliamentary election from the First Constituency of Zio Prefecture.

In the October 2007 parliamentary election, Klutse was the second candidate on the RPT's candidate list in Zio Prefecture, but failed to win a seat; all three seats in Zio were won by the opposition Union of the Forces of Change (UFC).

Klutse remained a member of the Political Bureau of the RPT and was again chosen as a member of the RPT Central Committee from Zio Prefecture at the party's 9th Congress in December 2006.

Klutse died on 19 May 2024, at the age of 78.

Preceded by Edem Kodjo	Prime Minister of Togo; 1996–1999	Succeeded by Eugène Koffi Adoboli
