= Foreign policy of the Mobutu Sese Seko administration =

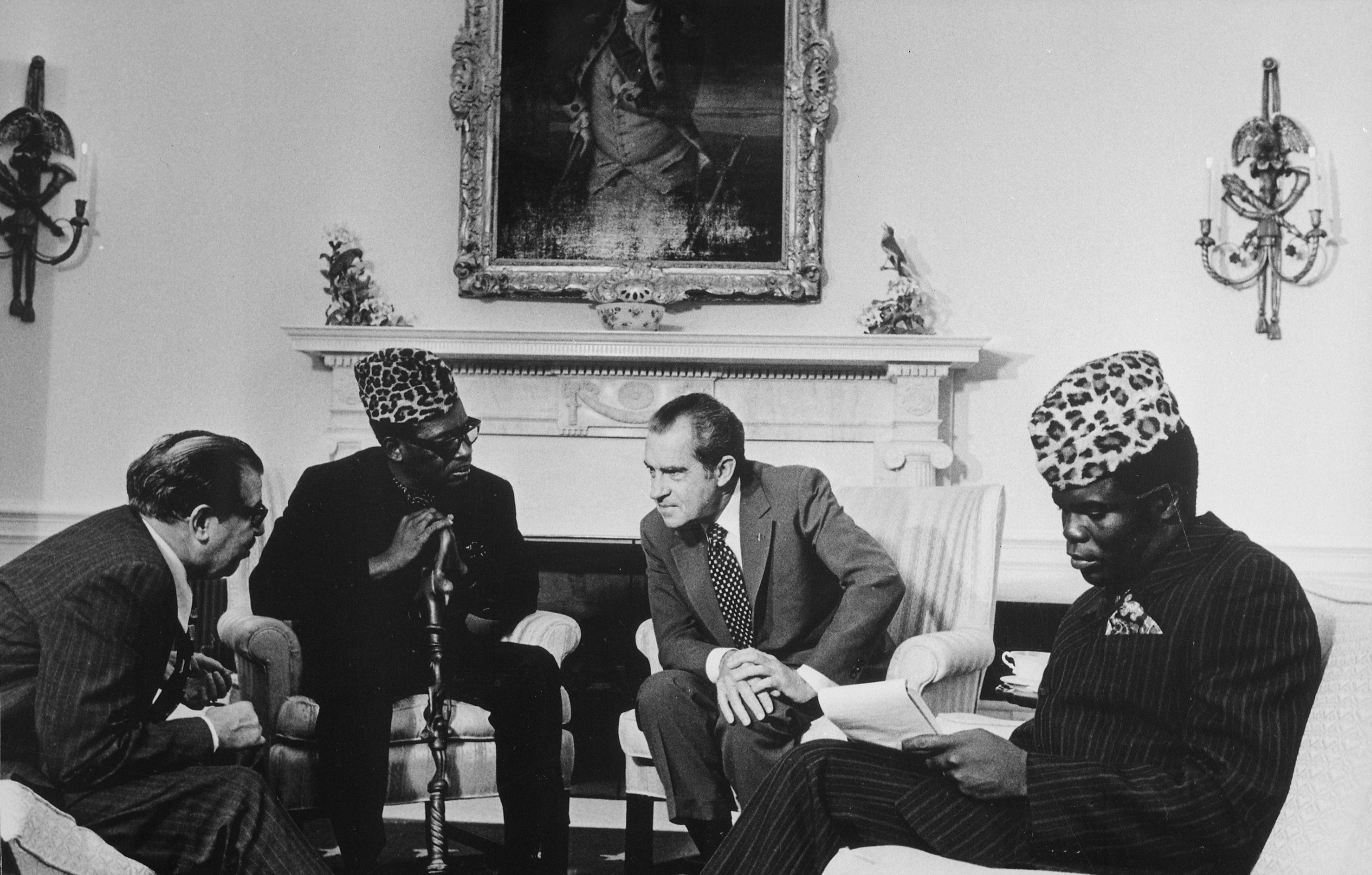
Mobutu Sese Seko and U.S. President Richard Nixon in Washington, D.C., 1973.

Mobutu Sese Seko's foreign policy emphasized his alliance with the United States and the Western world while supposedly maintaining a non-aligned position in international affairs. Mobutu ruled the Republic of the Congo and then Zaire as president for 32 years, from 1965 to 1997.

== United States ==
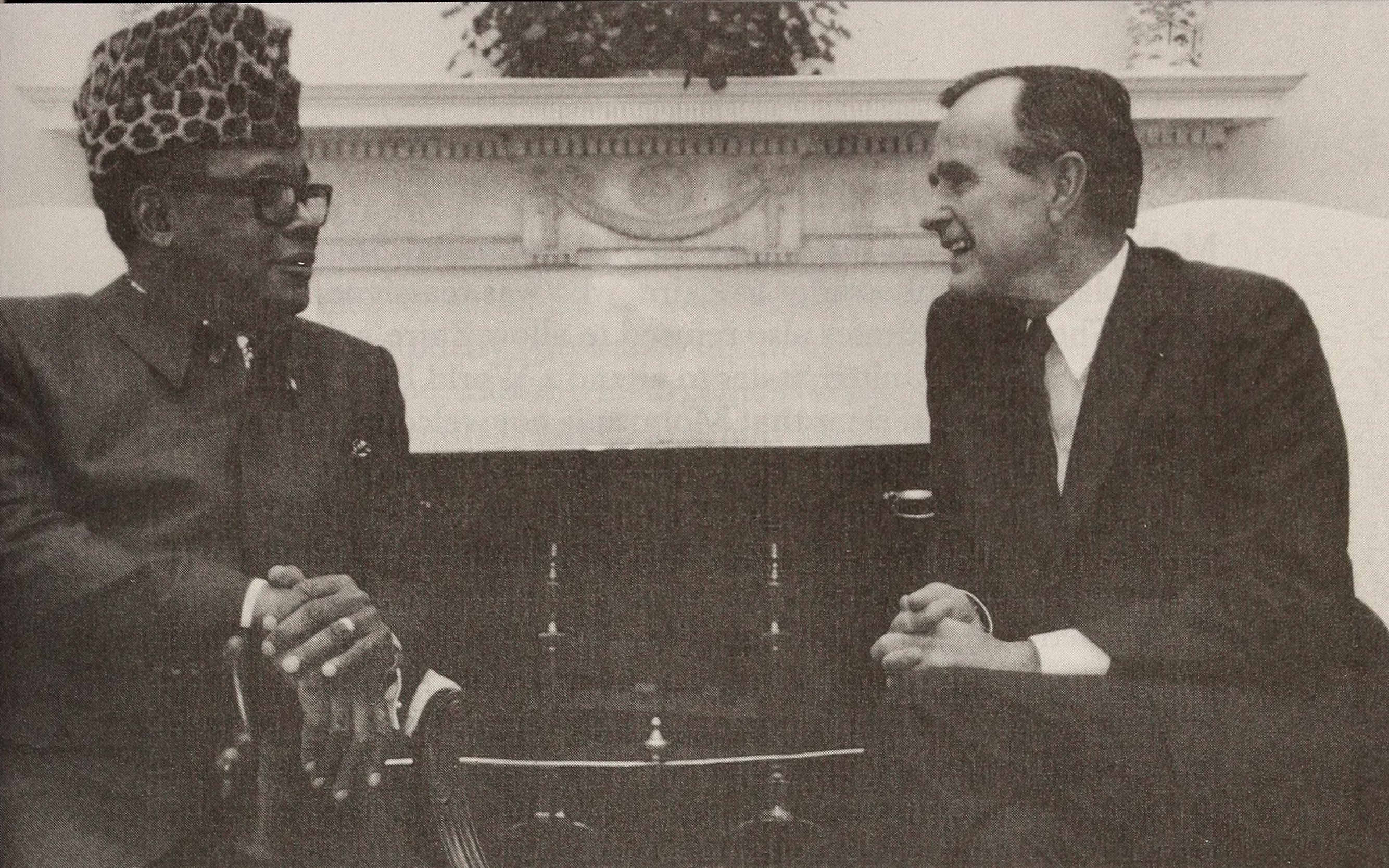
Mobutu Sese Seko and U.S. President George H. W. Bush in Washington, D.C., 1989.

For the most part, Zaire enjoyed warm relations with the United States. The United States was the third largest donor of aid to Zaire (after Belgium and France), and Mobutu befriended several U.S. presidents, including John F. Kennedy, Richard Nixon, Ronald Reagan, and George H. W. Bush. Relations did cool significantly between 1974 and 1975 over Mobutu's increasingly radical rhetoric, including his scathing denunciations of American foreign policy, and plummeted to an all-time low in the summer of 1975 when Mobutu accused the CIA of plotting to overthrow his government. Eleven senior Zairian generals and several civilians were arrested while a former head of the Central Bank was condemned (in absentia). However, Nzongola-Ntalaja, one of Mobutu's staunchest critics, speculated that Mobutu invented the plot as an excuse to purge the military of officers who might pose a threat to his rule. In spite of these hindrances, the chilly relationship quickly thawed during the Angolan Civil War when the U.S. government began aiding the anti-communist National Liberation Front of Angola (FNLA), led by Mobutu's Holden Roberto.

Because of Mobutu's poor human rights record, the Carter administration worked to put some distance between itself and the Kinshasa government; even so, Zaire was the recipient of nearly half the foreign aid Carter allocated sub-Saharan Africa. During the first Shaba invasion, the United States played a relatively inconsequential role; its belated intervention consisted of little more than the delivery of non-lethal supplies. But during the second Shaba invasion, the U.S. played a much more active and decisive role by providing transportation and logistical support to the French and Belgian paratroopers that were deployed to aid Mobutu against the rebels. Carter echoed Mobutu's (unsubstantiated) charges of Soviet and Cuban aid to the rebels, until it was apparent that no hard evidence existed to verify his claims. In 1980 the House of Representatives voted to terminate military aid to Zaire, but the Senate reinstated the funds, in response to pressure from Carter and American business interests in Zaire.

Mobutu enjoyed a very warm relationship with the Reagan administration (through financial donation); during Ronald Reagan's presidency, Mobutu visited the White House three times, and criticism of Zaire's human rights record by the U.S. was effectively muted. During a state visit by Mobutu in 1983 Reagan praised him as "a voice of good sense and goodwill".

Mobutu also had a cordial relationship with Reagan's successor, Bush; he was the first African head of state to visit Bush at the White House. Even so, Mobutu's relationship with the U.S. radically changed shortly afterward with the end of the Cold War; with the Soviet Union gone, there was no longer any reason to support Mobutu as a bulwark against communism. Accordingly, the U.S. and other Western powers began pressuring Mobutu to democratize the regime. Regarding the change in U.S. attitude to his regime, Mobutu bitterly remarked: "I am the latest victim of the cold war, no longer needed by the U.S. The lesson is that my support for American policy counts for nothing." In 1993 the U.S. State Department denied Mobutu a visa after he sought to visit Washington, D.C. Shortly after this, Mobutu was befriended by televangelist Pat Robertson, who promised to try to get the State Department to lift its ban on the African leader.

== Angola ==
Mobutu supported his ally, Holden Roberto, leader of the National Liberation Front of Angola, in his war for independence and his anti-communist struggle after 1975. Western nations hid aid to the FNLA by giving it to Mobutu who transferred it to Roberto. Mobutu's relationship with Roberto made the FNLA effectively part of the Zairian military.

Mobutu met with António de Spínola, the transitional President of Portugal, on 15 September 1974 on Sal island in Cape Verde, crafting a plan to empower Roberto, Jonas Savimbi of the National Union for the Total Independence of Angola (UNITA), and Daniel Chipenda of the People's Movement for the Liberation of Angola's (MPLA) eastern faction at MPLA leader Agostinho Neto's expense while retaining the facade of national unity. Mobutu and Spínola wanted to diminish Neto's standing and present Chipenda as the MPLA head, Mobutu particularly preferring Chipenda to Neto because Chipenda supported autonomy for Cabinda and Neto did not. The Angolan exclave has immense petroleum reserves estimated at around 300 million tons which Zaire, and thus the Mobutu government, depended on for economic survival.

== Belgium ==
Relations between Zaire and Belgium wavered between close intimacy and open hostility during Mobutu's reign. Relations soured early in Mobutu's rule over disputes involving the substantial Belgian commercial and industrial holdings in the country, but relations warmed soon afterwards. Mobutu and his family were received as personal guests of the Belgian monarch in 1968 and a convention for scientific and technical cooperation was signed that same year. During King Baudouin's highly successful visit to Kinshasa in 1970 a treaty of friendship and cooperation between the two countries was signed. However, Mobutu tore up the treaty in 1974 in protest of Belgium's refusal to ban an anti-Mobutu book written by left-wing lawyer Jules Chomé. Mobutu's "Zairianisation" policy, which expropriated foreign-held businesses and transferred their ownership to Zairians, added to the strain.

Even so, later in the 1970s, both sides made efforts to improve the relationship. In 1976 Zaire promised to compensate Belgians who had lost assets during "Zairianization", and also allowed foreigners whose property had been expropriated to recover 60% of their assets, leading to a Belgian renewal of interest in investment. Belgium also contributed paratroopers to Mobutu's defense during Shaba II in 1978.

One of Mobutu's main complaints was that dissidents, students, and exiled opponents were allowed to be active and publish in Belgium, although Belgium did expel François Lumumba (son of Patrice) in 1984 after he was accused of complicity in the bombings of the Voice of Zaire station and Kinshasa's central post office.

In 1988 Zaire's National Legislative Council threatened to break diplomatic relations with Belgium in response to accusations by the Belgian media that Mobutu was pocketing Belgian foreign aid money. From 1989 onward relations between Zaire and Belgium were periodically troubled over issues ranging from the subject of debt rescheduling to the 1990 University of Lubumbashi massacre. Belgium terminated all but humanitarian aid to Zaire, and in response, Mobutu expelled 700 Belgian technicians and closed all but one Belgian consular office in Zaire. In 1991 and 1993, Belgium and France deployed troops to Kinshasa to evacuate foreign nationals during riots by unpaid Zairian soldiers. Belgium became more overtly critical of Mobutu, with growing numbers of Belgian politicians calling upon Mobutu to resign. Belgium gave a strong indication of its disapproval with Mobutu when it refused to invite him to King Baudouin's funeral in 1993. Before 1990, Mobutu's relation with King Baudouin was cordial, but the amicable ties between the two heads of state already progressively declined after the death of Mobutu's first wife, Marie-Antoinette. After the massacre of Lubumbashi, and a bold statement by Mobutu about the Belgian royal family, the Belgian royal palace broke completely with Mobutu, and even Zairian ambassador Kimbulu was henceforth never invited to royal receptions.

== France ==
As the largest francophone country in sub-Saharan Africa - and the second-largest French-speaking country in the world, Zaire was of great strategic interest to France. During the First Republic era, France tended to side with the conservative and federalist forces, as opposed to unitarists such as Lumumba. Shortly after the Katangan secession was successfully crushed, Zaire (then called the Republic of the Congo), signed a treaty of technical and cultural cooperation with France. During the presidency of de Gaulle, relations with the two countries gradually grew stronger and closer. In 1971 then-Finance Minister Valéry Giscard d'Estaing visited Zaire. Later, after becoming President, he would develop a close personal relationship with President Mobutu and became one of the regime's closest foreign allies. During the Shaba invasions, France sided firmly with Mobutu: during the first Shaba invasion, France airlifted 1,500 Moroccan paratroopers to Zaire, and the rebels were repulsed. One year later, during the second Shaba invasion, France itself would send troops to aid Mobutu (along with Belgium).

Relations remained cordial throughout the remainder of the Cold War and, even after Belgium and the United States terminated all but humanitarian aid to Zaire, Franco-Zairian relations remained cordial, although France did join other Western countries in pressuring Mobutu to implement democratic reforms. In the aftermath of the Rwandan genocide, and the subsequent exodus of two million Rwandan Hutus to eastern Zaire, France pressed for international aid to Mobutu, believing him to be the only one capable of bringing a solution to the refugee crisis. Later, during the First Congo War, France repeatedly agitated for military intervention to save the Mobutu regime; however, unable to intervene directly, French intelligence arranged for 300 Serbian (White Legion) mercenaries to be brought to Zaire to aid Mobutu's crumbling army, but to no avail.

Until his death, Mobutu met with high-ranking French leaders. In 1996 he met then-President Jacques Chirac during what was officially a private visit to France. (Mobutu also owned a villa in Roquebrune-Cap-Martin, near Nice).

== Soviet Union ==
Mobutu's relationship with the Soviet Union was frosty and tense. Mobutu, a staunch anticommunist, was not anxious to recognize the Soviets; he remembered well their support, albeit mostly vocal, of Lumumba and the Simba rebels. However, to project a non-aligned image, he did renew ties in 1967; the first Soviet ambassador arrived and presented his credentials in 1968 (Mobutu did, however, join the U.S. in condemning the Soviet invasion of Czechoslovakia that year). Mobutu viewed the Soviet presence as advantageous for two reasons: it allowed him to maintain an image of non-alignment, and it provided a convenient scapegoat for problems at home. For example, in 1970, he expelled four Soviet diplomats for carrying out "subversive activities", and in 1971, twenty Soviet officials were declared persona non grata for allegedly instigating student demonstrations at Lovanium University.

Moscow was the only major world capital Mobutu never visited, although he did accept an invitation to do so in 1974; however, for reasons unknown, he cancelled the visit at the last minute, and toured the People's Republic of China and North Korea, instead.

Relations cooled further in 1975, when the two countries found themselves opposing different sides in the Angolan Civil War. This had a dramatic effect on Zairian foreign policy for the next decade; bereft of his claim to African leadership (Mobutu was one of the few leaders who denied the Marxist government of Angola recognition), Mobutu turned increasingly to the U.S. and its allies, adopting pro-American stances on such issues as the Soviet invasion of Afghanistan, Israel's position in international organizations, etc.

Mobutu condemned the Soviet invasion of Afghanistan in 1979, and in 1980, his was the first African nation to join the United States in boycotting the Summer Olympics in Moscow. Throughout the 1980s, he remained consistently anti-Soviet, and found himself opposing pro-Soviet countries such as Libya and Angola (he covertly supported the UNITA rebels); in the mid-1980s, he described Zaire as being surrounded by a "red belt" of communist and socialist states allied to the Soviet Union. In 1987, Mobutu expelled several Soviet diplomats after accusing them of spying on the country's military and trade unions. In response the Soviet Union expelled Zairian Consular Emany Mata Likambe and two technical workers.

The decline and eventual fall of the Soviet Union had disastrous repercussions for Mobutu. His anti-Soviet stance was the main justification for Western aid; without it, there was no longer any reason to support him. Western countries began calling for him to introduce democracy and improve human rights, leaving Zaire virtually isolated from international affairs.

== People's Republic of China ==
Initially, Zaire's relationship with the People's Republic of China was no better than its relationship with the Soviet Union. Memories of Chinese aid to Mulele and other Maoist rebels in Kwilu province during the ill-fated Simba rebellion remained fresh in Mobutu's mind. He also opposed seating China at the United Nations. However, by 1972, he began to see the Chinese in a different light, as a counterbalance to both the Soviet Union as well as his intimate ties with the United States, Israel, and South Africa. In November 1972, Mobutu extended the People's Republic of China (as well as East Germany and North Korea) diplomatic recognition. The following year, Mobutu paid a visit to Beijing, where he met personally with Chairman Mao and received promises of $100 million in technical aid. In 1974, Mobutu made a surprise visit to both China and North Korea, during the time he was originally scheduled to visit the Soviet Union. Upon returning home, both his politics and rhetoric became markedly more radical; it was around this time that Mobutu began criticizing Belgium and the United States (the latter for not doing enough, in Mobutu's opinion, to combat white minority rule in South Africa and Rhodesia), introduced the "obligatory civic work" program called salongo, and initiated "radicalization" (an extension of 1973's "Zairianization" policy). Mobutu even borrowed a title - the Helmsman - from Mao. Incidentally, late 1974-early 1975 was when his personality cult reached its peak.

China and Zaire shared a common goal in Central Africa, namely doing everything in their power to halt Soviet gains in the area. Accordingly, both Zaire and China covertly funneled aid to the FNLA (and later, UNITA) in order to prevent the MPLA, who were supported and augmented by Cuban forces, from coming to power. The Cubans, who exercised considerable influence in Africa in support of leftist and anti-imperialist forces, were heavily sponsored by the Soviet Union during the period. In addition to inviting Holden Roberto and his guerrillas to Beijing for training, China provided weapons and money to the rebels. Zaire itself launched an ill-fated, pre-emptive invasion of Angola in a bid to install a pro-Kinshasa government, but was repulsed by Cuban troops. The expedition was a fiasco with far-reaching repercussions, most notably the Shaba I and Shaba II invasions, both of which China opposed. China sent military aid to Zaire during both invasions, and accused the Soviet Union and Cuba (who were alleged to have supported the Shaban rebels, although this was and remains speculation) of working to de-stabilize Central Africa.

In 1983, as part of his 11 nation African tour, Premier Zhao Ziyang visited Kinshasa, and announced that he was cancelling Zaire's $100 million debt to China; the money borrowed would be reinvested in joint Chinese-Zairian projects. China continued to provide military equipment and training into the late 1980s. Following Mobutu's abandonment by the West, China assumed a more active role in the country; an estimated 1,000 Chinese technicians reportedly were working on agricultural and forestry projects in Zaire in the early 1990s.

== Libya ==
In the 1980s Mobutu's principal enemy was Muammar Gaddafi. In May 1985, while visiting Burundi, Gaddafi urged Zairians to rise up and "physically eliminate" Mobutu. When the Voice of Zaire and the Kinshasa central post office were bombed in 1984, in both cases the Zairian government blamed the Gaddafi government.

Zaire also militarily supported the GUNT government of Chad, led by Hissein Habré, during that country's conflict with Libya. Mobutu's primary fear was that a pro-Gaddafi government would take hold in Chad and threaten Sudan and the Central African Republic, both countries contiguous with Zaire.

Mobutu also enjoyed an amicable relationship with Sudan's Jaafar Nimeiry, who was also an enemy of the Gaddafi government.

By 1997, relations with Libya had improved, with Gaddafi expressing support for Mobutu in the First Congo War.

== Rwanda ==
Mobutu enjoyed a strong relationship with Rwanda under the late President Juvénal Habyarimana; in October 1990, Zaire intervened militarily (in concert with French and Belgian forces) to aid Habyarimana's government from the Rwandan Patriotic Front in the country's civil war.

== Togo ==
Another close ally and personal friend of Mobutu was Togolese strongman Gnassingbé Eyadéma. In the aftermath of Shaba II, Togo was one of the countries which contributed peacekeeping forces to Zaire. In 1986, Mobutu, in turn, sent two airborne companies to Lomé to stabilize the capital in the aftermath of an attempted coup against Eyadéma. After his overthrow in 1997, Mobutu settled briefly in Togo, where he was allowed to stay in the presidential palace; however, under pressure from his opponents, Eyadéma soon relocated Mobutu to Morocco, flying him there on his (Eyadéma's) private jet.

== Romania ==
Among Mobutu's closest allies and friends was Nicolae Ceauşescu, the dictator of Romania. Relations were not just state-to-state, but party-to-party, between the Popular Movement of the Revolution (MPR) and the Romanian Communist Party (PCR). Many speculate that Mobutu's decision to "democratize" his regime was inspired, at least in part, by Ceauşescu's execution in the Romanian Revolution.

== Other relations ==
Zaire's relations with several of its neighbors – including Angola, Zambia, Tanzania, and Uganda – were strained. Other countries with which Zaire had cool relations were Cuba and East Germany; Zaire severed diplomatic relations with both countries in the spring of 1977, due to their alleged support of anti-Mobutu rebels during Shaba I (although Mobutu did restore relations with Cuba two years later, so that Zaire could participate in the 6th Summit of the Non-Aligned Movement held in Havana in that year).
