= Solitoki Esso =

Togolese politician

Solitoki Magnim Esso is a Togolese politician who has served in the government of Togo as Minister of State for Presidential Affairs since September 2013. He served in the government as Minister of Communication and Culture during the 1990s; later, he was Minister of State for the Civil Service and Administrative Reform from May 2010 to August 2012 and Minister of State for Primary and Secondary Education from August 2012 to September 2013. He was elected as Secretary-General of the Rally of the Togolese People (RPT) in December 2006.

== Political career ==
On September 11, 1979, Esso was appointed as Director of Television by President Gnassingbé Eyadéma. He was elected to the National Assembly in the March 1985 parliamentary election, winning the seat for Binah Nord constituency in Binah Prefecture with 62.24% of the vote.

Esso was appointed to the government as Minister of Communication and Culture on November 29, 1995. Later, he was appointed as vice-president of the National Commission for the Fight Against Corruption and Economic Sabotage on September 14, 2001.

On August 27, 2002, the National Assembly voted to replace Dahuku Péré, who had called for reform in the RPT, with Esso in the ECOWAS Parliament. However, the ECOWAS Parliament objected to the National Assembly's move, saying that there was no valid basis for unilaterally replacing Péré with Esso.

Esso was elected to the National Assembly in the October 2002 parliamentary election from the First Constituency of Binah Prefecture. In the National Assembly, he served as President of the Commission of Constitutional Laws and General Administration Legislation. When the Pan-African Parliament began meeting in March 2004, Esso became one of Togo's five members.

Esso was one of three parliamentary deputies who accompanied Bonfoh Abbas, the President of the National Assembly, during his visit to the Second World Conference of Speakers of Parliaments in September 2005. On November 2, 2005, Esso was elected by the National Assembly as one of Togo's five members of the ECOWAS Parliament, receiving 62 votes from the 68 deputies present. Esso subsequently became one of the 16 members of the National Commission of the Modernization of Legislation, which was installed on June 23, 2006.

At the RPT's Ninth Ordinary Congress, Esso was elected as Secretary-General of the RPT for a three-year term on December 18, 2006. He was proposed for that position by President Faure Gnassingbé. At the time of Esso's election, he was Technical Advisor to the Presidency. Esso is a member of the RPT Political Bureau and a member of the RPT Central Committee from Binah Prefecture as of the Ninth Ordinary Congress.

In the 31-member government appointed by President Gnassingbé on 28 May 2010, Esso was brought back into the government as Minister of State for the Civil Service and Administrative Reform; he became the second ranking member of the government, after Prime Minister Gilbert Houngbo. After two years in that post, Esso was instead appointed as Minister of State for Primary and Secondary Education in August 2012. He was moved to the post of Minister of State for Presidential Affairs on 17 September 2013.
