= Cheffi Meatchi =

Togolese politician

Josephine Cheffi Meatchi was a Togolese politician.

Meatchi was one of six women elected to the Parliament of Togo in 1979; the others were Abra Amedomé, Kossiwa Monsila, Essohana Péré, Zinabou Touré, and Adjoavi Trenou. She was the wife of Togolese vice president Antoine Meatchi, and herself later served in the government; she was the Secretary of State for Social and Women's Affairs in 1984.
