= 1986 Togolese coup attempt =

1986 coup attempt in Togo

1986 Togolese coup d'état attempt
Date	23 September 1986
Location	Lomé, Togo 6°7′55″N 1°13′22″E
Result	Coup attempt fails.: Gnassingbé Eyadéma remains in power.

Belligerents
Armed dissidents Supported by: Ghana	Government; Supported by: France

Commanders and leaders
	Gnassingbé Eyadéma

Strength
70	

Casualties and losses
7 killed, 19 captured	
- 13–14 people killed.
- Nexus of coup attempt in Lomé (marked green), Togo

The 1986 Togolese coup d'état attempt was a coup attempt that occurred in the West African country of Togo on 23 September 1986. The coup attempt consisted of a group of some 70 armed dissidents crossed into capital Lomé from Ghana in an unsuccessful attempt to overthrow the government of President General Gnassingbé Eyadéma.

== The coup attempt ==
According to radio reports, at about 20:00 UTC, the rebels entered Lomé (located on the border with Ghana) in about 30–40 trucks. They headed straight for a military camp in where Eyadéma resided, and opened fire with automatic weapons and rocket launchers.

The rebels also attacked the radio station and the governing RPT party headquarters.

A radio report said the rebel attack was repulsed by a counterattack led by Eyadema himself. The crushing of the coup attempt involved Togolese Armed Forces troops and warplanes. At least 14 or 13 people were killed in an all-night street battle, and 19 of the rebels were captured. 6 civilians also were killed, state-run radio reported.

The West German Foreign Ministry officials said in Bonn that their citizen, a businessman, was killed in the fighting. They described the battle as an apparent bid to topple the government.

== Aftermath ==
The Ghana–Togo border was closed. People were ordered off the streets, and an indefinite curfew was imposed on Lomé.

Following the request of Eyadéma for military help of France, the French Defence Ministry said on 26 September that it was sending warplanes and troops to Togo. The ministry said the troops were being sent in line with a 1963 agreement with Togo.

Eyadéma was re-elected unopposed at the 21 December 1986 presidential election, and continued to rule the country until his death on 5 February 2005.
