= Sarakawa Mausoleum =

Memorial site in Sarakawa, Togo

Coordinates: 9.6108°N 1.0735°E

- Mausolée de Sarakawa
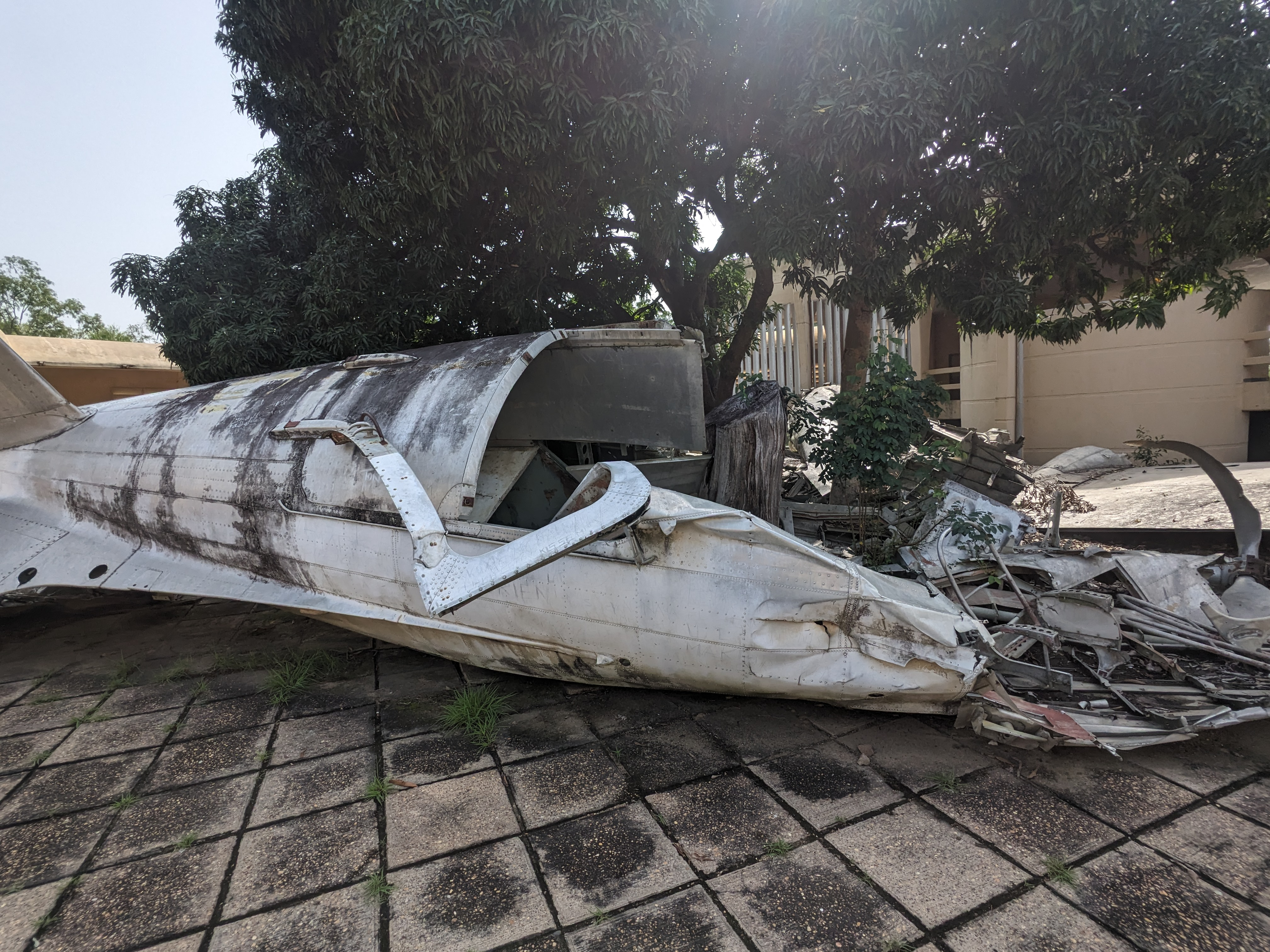
- Preserved wreckage of the aircraft at the memorial
- Interactive map of Sarakawa Mausoleum
- Location: Sarakawa, Kozah 2, Kozah Prefecture, Kara Region
- Type: Memorial
- Dedicated to: Victims of the 1974 Togolese Air Force C-47 crash

The Sarakawa Mausoleum (French: Mausolée de Sarakawa) is a memorial site in Sarakawa, in the Kozah 2 municipality of Kozah Prefecture, Kara Region, Togo. It commemorates the aircraft crash of 24 January 1974, in which a Togolese Air Force aircraft carrying President Gnassingbé Eyadéma and other officials crashed near Sarakawa. Eyadéma survived, while several people on board were killed.

The memorial complex includes remains of the aircraft, a statue of Eyadéma and monuments dedicated to those who died in the crash. It is the site of official annual commemorations of the event.

== History ==
On 24 January 1974, a Douglas C-47 Skytrain of the Togolese Air Force, carrying President Gnassingbé Eyadéma and several political and military officials, crashed near Sarakawa while travelling from Lomé to Pya. Eyadéma survived, while several occupants of the aircraft were killed.

Eyadéma subsequently maintained that the crash had been caused by sabotage connected with tensions surrounding Togo's phosphate industry. The event has therefore traditionally been referred to in official Togolese commemorations as the Sarakawa attack (attentat de Sarakawa), although other accounts have treated it as an aviation accident.

The mausoleum was built following the crash and developed into a national memorial and ceremonial site.

== Memorial ==
The complex incorporates the wreckage of the aircraft involved in the crash. Academic studies of the political symbolism developed around Sarakawa have identified the aircraft wreckage as a central element of the memorial.

The memorial also includes a standing statue of Gnassingbé Eyadéma, surrounded by three altars bearing photographs of three generals who died in the crash.

== Commemorations ==
Official commemorative ceremonies are held at the mausoleum around 24 January, the anniversary of the crash. They traditionally include wreath-laying ceremonies and tributes to those who died.

Senior political, administrative, military and traditional authorities regularly attend the ceremonies. Faure Gnassingbé has presided over a number of anniversary commemorations at the site. At the 52nd anniversary ceremony in January 2026, he laid a wreath at the mausoleum in his capacity as President of the Council.

== Rehabilitation ==
The mausoleum has undergone several rehabilitation programmes. In 2020, the Togolese government allocated 25 million CFA francs for rehabilitation work on the site.

In February 2021, the government announced another rehabilitation programme, with the planned works expected to take three months.

A further tender for rehabilitation of the mausoleum was issued by the Ministry of Public Works and Infrastructure in 2025.

== See also ==
- 1974 Togolese Air Force C-47 crash
- Gnassingbé Eyadéma
- History of Togo

== See also ==
=== Further reading ===
- Toulabor, Comi M. (1986). Le Togo sous Eyadéma (in French). Paris: Karthala. ISBN 2-86537-150-6.

=== External links ===
- Media related to Mausolée de Sarakawa at Wikimedia Commons
