= Abra Amedomé =

Togolese politician

Minister of Social Affairs and Women's Production
- In office 1979–1983

President of the Union Nationale des Femmes Togolaises
- Incumbent
- Assumed office 1975

Member of the Parliament of Togo
- Incumbent
- Assumed office 1979

Personal details
- Born: Abra Julie Mawupé Vovor
- Party: National ruling party (Togo)
- Spouse: Prof. Antoine Afantchao Amedome
- Relatives: Prof. Mawupe Valentin Vovor (sibling)
- Education: Trained in Pharmacy
- Alma mater: Montpellier, France
- Occupation: Politician, Pharmacist, Businesswoman
- Known for: First woman pharmacist in Togo

Abra Amedomé, born Abra Julie Mawupé Vovor, was a Togolese politician woman. She is the youngest of the same sibling as professor Mawupe Valentin Vovor.

Trained as a pharmacist in Montpellier, France, Abra Julie Amedome returned to Togo and became a highly successful businesswoman. She was the first woman pharmacist in Togo. She was married to professor Antoine Afantchao Amedome (professor of medecine). She took a leading role in the national ruling party, and in 1975 became president of the Union National des Femmes Togolaise. In 1979 she became minister of social affairs and women's production, continuing in this role until 1983. She was one of six women elected to the Parliament of Togo in 1979; the others were Cheffi Meatchi, Kossiwa Monsila, Essohana Péré, Zinabou Touré, and Adjoavi Trenou.
