= 1985 Togolese parliamentary election =

- 25 March 1985
- All 77 seats in the National Assembly; 39 seats needed for a majority
- Turnout: 78.59% (▼20.66pp)
Party	Leader	Vote %	Seats	+/–
RPT	Gnassingbé Eyadéma	100	77	+10
This lists parties that won seats. See the complete results below.

Parliamentary elections were held in Togo on 24 March 1985. The country was a one-party state at the time, with the Rally of the Togolese People as the sole legal party. Unlike the previous election in 1979 when a single list of candidates was presented to voters for approval, this election was contested by 216 candidates running for 77 seats and 22 reserve members. Voter turnout was reported to be 78.6%.

== Results ==
Party	Votes	%	Seats	+/–
Rally of the Togolese People	1,024,533	100.00	77	+10
Total	1,024,533	100.00	77	+10
Valid votes	1,024,533	98.80		
Invalid/blank votes	12,422	1.20		
Total votes	1,036,955	100.00		
Registered voters/turnout	1,319,439	78.59		
Source: Nohlen et al.
