= Forces nouvelles =

Forces nouvelles (French for New Forces) can refer to:

- Forces nouvelles (art): founded in France in 1934, a group of young artists who rejected Surrealism and abstraction in favour of an accessible, broadly realist style.
- Forces Nouvelles de Côte d'Ivoire: a political party coalition and one of the sides in the Ivorian Civil War. It can also refer more generally to the rebels in that war.
- Parti des forces nouvelles: a French far right political party formed in November 1974 from the Comité faire front, a group of anti-Jean-Marie Le Pen dissidents who had split from the National Front (FN).
- Party of New Forces (Belgium): a Belgian far right party
- Coordination of New Forces or Coordination des forces nouvelles (CFN): A political party in Togo.
