= Union for Justice and Democracy =

Historical Togolese political party

The Union for Justice and Democracy (French: Union pour la Justice et la Démocratie, UJD) was a political party in Togo.

== History ==
The UJD won two of the 81 seats in the 1994 parliamentary elections.

In November 1996 the party merged into the ruling Rally of the Togolese People.
