= Kossiwa Monsila =

Togolese politician

Kossiwa Monsila was a Togolese politician. She was one of six women elected to the Parliament of Togo in 1979; the others were Abra Amedomé, Cheffi Meatchi, Essohana Péré, Zinabou Touré, and Adjoavi Trenou.
