= Adjoavi Trenou =

Togolese activist and politician

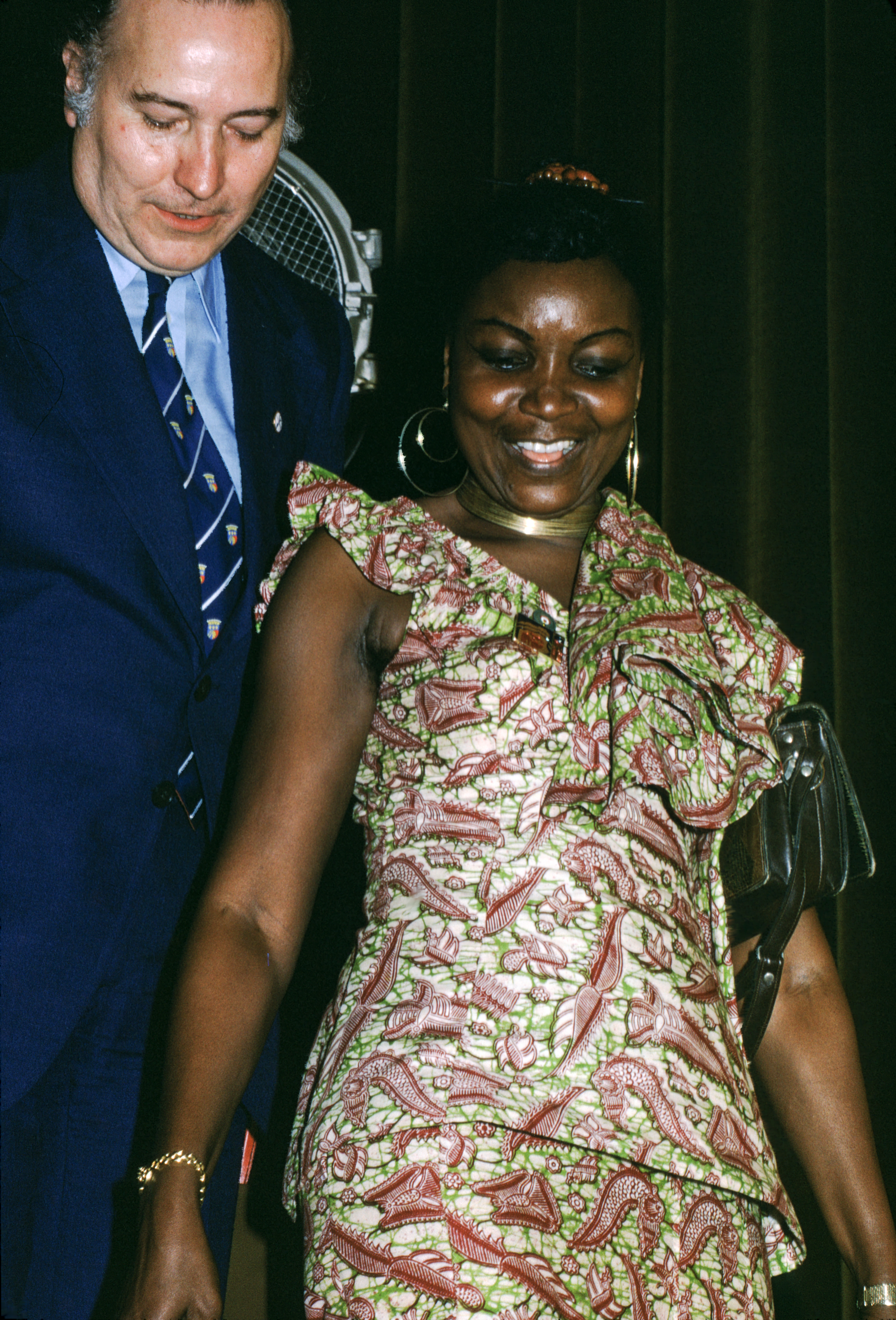
Adjoavi Trenou in 1975

Marguerite Adjoavi Trenou (died 3 November 2008) was a Togolese activist and politician. She was one of six women elected to the Parliament of Togo in 1979; the others were Abra Amedomé, Cheffi Meatchi, Kossiwa Monsila, Essohana Péré, and Zinabou Touré. At one time she served as the Secretary General of the National Union of Women of Togo. She obtained her law degree from the University of Abidjan in 1971 and accepted to the Togolese bar after obtaining her CAPA (Certificate of Aptitude to the Profession of Attorney) in 1972; Prior to that, she was Secretary General of the Togolese Chamber of Commerce and Director of the Togolese Caisse National de Sécurité Sociale. She was a former principal of the École Normale des Jeunes filles in Rufisque. She was buried in Lomé on November 22, 2008.
