= Adoboli =

Adoboli is a West African surname. Notable people with the surname include:

- Eugène Koffi Adoboli (1934–2025), Togolese politician
- Kweku Adoboli (born 1980), Ghanaian investment manager and former stock trader
