= Togolese Union for Democracy =

Defunct political party in Togo

The Togolese Union for Democracy (French: Union togolaise pour la démocratie, UTD) was a political party in Togo.

== History ==
The UTD was formed in 1991 by Edem Kodjo as a breakaway from the former sole legal party, the Rally of the Togolese People. The UTD won seven of the 81 seats in the 1994 parliamentary elections, during which it formed an alliance with the Action Committee for Renewal (CAR) for the second round of the elections, and between them the two parties won a majority of seats, defeating the former sole legal party, the Rally of the Togolese People (RPT). Although the results in three seats were annulled, one of which had been won by the UTD, the parties maintained a parliamentary majority.

The parties nominated CAR leader Yawovi Agboyibo as Prime Minister, but the nomination was rejected by President Gnassingbé Eyadéma, who instead appointed Kodjo. This resulted in the CAR pulling out of the alliance, claiming Kodj's acceptance of the post violated the coalition agreement. As a result, Kodjo formed a government with the RPT, with most ministerial posts given to the RPT.

In 1999 the party merged with the Party of Action for Democracy, the Party of Democrats for Unity and the Union for Democracy and Solidarity to form the Pan-African Patriotic Convergence.
