= Léopold Gnininvi =

Togolese politician

Léopold Messan Kokou Gnininvi (born December 19, 1942) is a Togolese politician and the Secretary-General of the Democratic Convention of African Peoples (CDPA). A long-time opposition leader in Togo, he served in the government as Minister of State for Mines and Energy from 2006 to 2007, Minister of State for Foreign Affairs and Regional Integration from 2007 to 2008, and Minister of State for Industry, Crafts, and Technological Innovations from 2008 to 2009.

== Life and career ==
Gnininvi was born in Aného, Lacs Prefecture. He is a Doctor of Physics and Mathematics, having received his doctorat d'Etat from the University of Dijon in France in 1977. He became a full professor in 1981. From 1978 to 1993, he was the head of the solar energy laboratory at the University of Lomé. He was Director of the National Institute of Educational Science from 1979 to 1988 and National Director of Scientific Research from 1987 to 1993. He retired from teaching at the University of Lomé in 1997.

Gnininvi was elected as Secretary-General of the CDPA in March 1991. At the 1991 Sovereign National Conference, Gnininvi was the opposition's initial choice for the position of Prime Minister, but he withdrew in favor of Joseph Kokou Koffigoh, the leader of the Togolese League of Human Rights, who was better known than Gnininvi, for the sake of opposition unity. He became the President-in-Office of the Collective of the Democratic Opposition (COD2), the main opposition coalition, in August 1992. In 1992 and August 1997, he was re-elected as Secretary-General of the CDPA.

He was the CDPA candidate in the June 1998 presidential election, and was the first declared candidate in the election. Two weeks prior to the election, he sent a letter to the electoral commission in which he stated his "concern over anomalies and delays surrounding the organization of the election". Two days before the election, he joined other opposition candidates in criticizing alleged problems in the electoral preparations and calling for the election to be delayed. According to official results, he placed fifth in the election, taking 0.80% of the vote. In November 1998, after President Gnassingbé Eyadéma called for the opposition to engage in talks, Gnininvi said that the CDPA would not participate because the talks were only intended to legitimize the rule of Eyadéma's Rally of the Togolese People (RPT) party.

Gnininvi initially ran as a candidate in the presidential election of June 1, 2003, but he announced his withdrawal from the election on May 26, choosing to back fellow opposition candidate Emmanuel Bob-Akitani of the Union of Forces for Change (UFC) instead. He said he made this decision because he had already mobilized his supporters for the election and because he wanted the opposition to unite behind the strongest candidate from its ranks. His name remained on the ballot, however, and received 0.017% of the vote.

He was appointed Minister of State for Mines and Energy in the government of Prime Minister Yawovi Agboyibo, named on September 20, 2006. In the run-up to the October 2007 parliamentary election, Gnininivi praised the "remarkable work" of the National Independent Electoral Commission (CENI) and said that the electoral census conducted by CENI had ensured "a credible process". Gnininvi was the first candidate on the CDPA's candidate list for Lomé in the 2007 election, but the party did not win any seats in the election. Following the election, Gnininvi remained in the government appointed on December 13, 2007, under Prime Minister Komlan Mally and was moved to the position of Minister of State for Foreign Affairs and Regional Integration.

In the next government, appointed on September 15, 2008, and headed by Prime Minister Gilbert Houngbo, Gnininvi was moved to the position of Minister of State for Industry, Crafts, and Technological Innovations. He remained in that post for one year; on September 10, 2009, he resigned from the government, together with the other CDPA minister, Messan Adimado ADUAYOM, so that the CDPA would not be tied to the government in the period preceding the 2010 presidential election.
