= Party for Democracy and Renewal =

Political party in Togo

The Party for Democracy and Renewal (French: Parti pour la Démocratie et le Renouveau) is a political party in Togo. It was founded on May 1, 1991, and its National President is Zarifou Ayéva.

The party has held three statutory congress: in 1991, 1998, and on February 24, 2007.

Ayéva ran as the PDR candidate in the June 1998 presidential election, taking fourth place with 3.02% of the vote according to official results. On August 17, 1998, the PDR was the target of two explosions: one damaged its prefectural office in Sokodé and the other damaged the home of a PDR official in Bafilo. On the same day, a residence belonging to Ayéva was ransacked by security forces.

The party boycotted the March 1999 parliamentary election along with the rest of the opposition, as well as the October 2002 parliamentary election. It participated in the October 2007 parliamentary election, but did not win any seats.

Ayéva has been accused of leading the party in an autocratic manner. The resignations of many leading members of the party, including three—Tchassona-Traoré Mouhamed, Innoussa Nafiou, and Adam Abdou Rahamane—in September 2006, have been attributed to this alleged tendency.
