= 1990 Togolese parliamentary election =

- 4 March 1990 (first round); 18 March 1990 (second round)
- All 77 seats in the National Assembly; 39 seats needed for a majority
- Turnout: 78.67% (▼0.08pp)
| Party | Leader | Vote % | Seats | +/– |
|---|---|---|---|---|
| RPT | Gnassingbé Eyadéma | 100 | 77 | 0 |
This lists parties that won seats. See the complete results below.

Parliamentary elections were held in Togo on 4 March 1990, with a second round on 18 March in eight constituencies. The country was a one-party state at the time, with the Rally of the Togolese People as the sole legal party. The election won contested by 230 candidates running for 77 seats. Voter turnout was 78.7%.

== Results ==
| Party | Votes | % | Seats | +/– |
|---|---|---|---|---|
| Rally of the Togolese People | 1,175,602 | 100.00 | 77 | 0 |
| Total | 1,175,602 | 100.00 | 77 | 0 |
| Valid votes | 1,175,602 | 98.15 | | |
| Invalid/blank votes | 22,152 | 1.85 | | |
| Total votes | 1,197,754 | 100.00 | | |
| Registered voters/turnout | 1,522,491 | 78.67 | | |
Source: Nohlen et al.
