= Zarifou Ayéva =

Togolese politician (1942–2025)

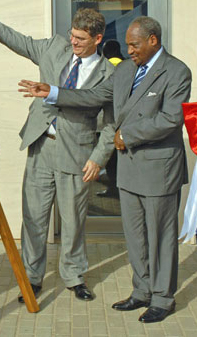
Ayéva (right) in 2007

Zarifou Ayéva (22 April 1942 – 15 December 2025) was a Togolese politician who was the President of the Party for Democracy and Renewal (PDR). He served in the government of Togo as a minister during the 1970s and became an opposition leader in the early 1990s. He was a minor candidate in the 1998 presidential election and later served as Minister of State for Foreign Affairs from 2005 to 2007.

== Life and career ==
Ayéva was born in Sokodé, Tchaoudjo Prefecture on 22 April 1942. He was appointed to the government as Minister of Trade, Industry, and Transport on 5 March 1975, and he was appointed Deputy Director-General of the National Iron and Steel Company (Société Nationale de Sidérurgie, SNS) in Lomé in 1977. He was also appointed Secretary-General of the Togolese National Olympic Committee on 17 March 1977.

He was retained in the government as Minister of Trade and Transport on 17 January 1978 before being moved to the position of Minister of Information on 14 November 1978. He was dismissed from the government on 19 March 1979, and was appointed Director-General of SNS on the same day, remaining in that post until 1982.

Ayéva subsequently became the President of the PDR, which was founded in May 1991, and from 1991 to 1993 he was a member of the High Council of the Republic (HCR), which acted as the transitional parliament; on the HCR, he served as President of the Commission on Foreign Affairs, Defense, and Security. He was an unsuccessful candidate in the June 1998 presidential election, taking fourth place with 3.02% of the vote. On 18 June, three days before the election, he and fellow opposition candidate Yawovi Agboyibo called for the election to be delayed due to irregularities during electoral preparations and difficulties they faced in campaigning, including their treatment by the High Audiovisual and Communication Authority. A residence belonging to Ayéva was ransacked by security forces on 17 August 1998.

In the government named on 20 June 2005, which included members of the opposition, Ayéva was appointed Minister of State for Foreign Affairs and African Integration.

At the PDR's Third Statutory Congress, held on 24 February 2007, was re-elected as the party's president. In the October 2007 parliamentary election, he was the first candidate on the PDR's candidate list for Tchaoudjo Prefecture, but the PDR did not win any seats in the election.

Following the election, Ayéva was replaced as Foreign Minister by another opposition leader, Léopold Gnininvi, in the government of Prime Minister Komlan Mally, named on 13 December 2007.

Ayéva died after a long illness on 15 December 2025, at the age of 83.
