= Philippe Nassar =

Togolese politician (1916–1972)

Philippe Nassar (1916-1972) was a Togolese businessman and politician, of Lebanese origins.

He was born in Lomé on March 3, 1916. Philippe Nassar's grandfather Michel Nasr had migrated from Lebanon to German Togoland in 1885, settling down in Keta to open a business venture there. Philippe Nassar became a commerce and transport entrepreneur, and emerged as a prominent figure in the business sectors in Togo. He was a member of the Chamber of Commerce of Togo.

Besides his role in business, Nassar contributed to the Committee of Togolese Unity (CUT) political party. He was the chairman of the Executive Committee of the Tsévié District. He was a member of the Executive Committee of the Youth of Togolese Unity. Nassar was elected to the National Assembly in the 1961 election, standing as a CUT candidate. He was the deputy treasurer of the CUT parliamentary faction. His parliamentary mandate ended with the 1963 coup d'état.

Nassar died on April 21, 1972.
