= 1999 Togolese parliamentary election =

- 21 March 1999
- All 81 seats in the National Assembly; 41 seats needed for a majority
- Turnout: 66.03% (▲0.93pp)
Party	Leader	Seats	+/–
RPT	Gnassingbé Eyadéma	79	+44
Independents	–	2	New
This lists parties that won seats. See the complete results below.
Prime Minister before	Prime Minister after
Kwassi Klutse; RPT	Eugène Koffi Adoboli; RPT

Parliamentary elections were held in Togo on 21 March 1999. They were boycotted by the eight opposition parties, who been rebuffed in their insistence that talks following the controversial presidential elections the previous year must be completed prior to the parliamentary elections. As a result only three parties ran in the elections, the ruling Rally of the Togolese People (RPT), together with two small parties allied with it; the Coordination of New Forces and the Pan African Environmentalist Party. In addition, twelve independent candidates also ran.

The result was an overwhelming victory for the RPT, which won 79 of the 81 seats, the other two going to independents.

== Results ==
Party	Votes	%	Seats	+/–
Rally of the Togolese People			79	+44
Coordination of New Forces			0	–1
Pan African Environmentalist Party			0	New
Independents			2	New
Total			81	0
Valid votes	1,547,116	97.14		
Invalid/blank votes	45,545	2.86		
Total votes	1,592,661	100.00		
Registered voters/turnout	2,412,027	66.03		
Source: Journal Officiel
