= Zinabou Touré =

Togolese politician

Zinabou Touré was a Togolese politician. She was one of six women elected to the Parliament of Togo in 1979; the others were Abra Amedomé, Cheffi Meatchi, Kossiwa Monsila, Essohana Péré, and Adjoavi Trenou.
