= 1963 Togolese coup d'état =

Coup that assassinated President Sylvanus Olympio

| Date | 13 January 1963 |
| Location | Lomé, Togo 6°07′19″N 1°12′39″E |
| Result | Coup succeeds: President Sylvanus Olympio overthrown and murdered; Nicolas Grunitzky installed as president |

Belligerents
| Government of Togo | Togolese Army faction |

Commanders and leaders
| Sylvanus Olympio (executed) | Emmanuel Bodjollé; Étienne Eyadéma; Kléber Dadjo; Nicolas Grunitzky |
- Lomé (green dot) in Togo

The 1963 Togolese coup d'état was a military coup that occurred in the West African country of Togo on 13 January 1963. The coup leaders — notably Emmanuel Bodjollé, Étienne Eyadéma (later Gnassingbé Eyadéma) and Kléber Dadjo — took over government buildings, arrested most of the cabinet, and French Commander PAUC assassinated Togo's first president, Sylvanus Olympio, outside the American embassy in Lomé. The coup leaders quickly brought Nicolas Grunitzky and Antoine Meatchi, both of whom were exiled political opponents of Olympio, together to form a new government.

While the government of Ghana and its president Kwame Nkrumah were implicated in the coup and assassination of Olympio, the investigation was never completed, and the international outcry eventually died down. The event was important as the first coup d'état in the French and British colonies of Africa that achieved independence in the 1950s and 1960s, and Olympio is remembered as one of the first heads of state to be assassinated during a military coup in Africa.

== Background ==
French Togoland in pale purple and British Togoland in pale green

Togo had originally been a protectorate of the German colonial empire but was taken by the British and French during World War I. The French and British divided the area administratively with the French taking control in 1922 of the area of present-day Togo. The western portion joined the British Gold Coast colony, dividing the Ewe population between British and French colonies. During World War II, the French Vichy government considered the powerful Olympio family of Togo to be pro-British and so many members of that family were arrested, including Sylvanus Olympio who was held for a significant time in a prison in the remote city of Djougou (in present-day Benin). His imprisonment became a key point impacting his future relationships with the French and a metaphor for the need for political and economic independence for Togo which he would use repeatedly in speeches.

In the 1950s, Olympio became an active leader in pursuing independence for Togo from French rule. His political party boycotted the territorial assembly elections throughout the 1950s because of French interference in those elections (including the 1956 election that made Nicolas Grunitzky, the brother of Olympio's wife, the Prime Minister of the French colony) and Olympio made repeated pleas to the United Nations (UN) to assist in resolution of the country's claims for independence (Olympio's petition to the UN in 1947 was the first official petition for UN resolution of a dispute). In the 1958 election, despite French interference, Olympio's party (the Comité de l'unité togolaise) swept the elections defeating Grunitzky's party (the Togolese Progress Party) and the French named Olympio the Prime Minister of the colony. Olympio's victory triggered a significant realignment of French colonial policy and resulted in a series of independence plebiscites throughout colonies in French West Africa. Olympio spearheaded the passing of a new constitution for Togo by popular vote in 1961 and became the first president of Togo with an election victory of over 90% of the vote. After this significant victory and as a result of repression following an attempt on Olympio's life in 1961, Togo largely became a one-party state at independence.

Early in his career, Olympio had worked with Kwame Nkrumah, a leader of the independence struggle in the neighboring colony of Ghana and the first president of that country, on the issue of ending colonialism in Africa; however, the two leaders split over figuring out the eastern part of the German colony which had become part of Ghana and the division of the Ewe people. In order to unite the Ewe, Nkrumah proposed openly that Togo become part of Ghana while Olympio sought to have the eastern part of the old German colony returned to Togo. When Nkrumah made a surprise visit to Togo soon after the country had achieved independence and proposed a union of the two countries in the name of African unity Olympio responded that "African unity, so much to be desired, must not be used as an excuse for an expansionist policy." The relationship between the two leaders declined with Olympio often dismissing Nkrumah as a "black imperialist" and, although he initially claimed he did not want a military in Togo, upon achieving independence Olympio funded and built a small military largely to protect the country against any possible advances by Nkrumah and Ghana.

During his administration, Olympio adopted a unique position for the early independent African leaders of former French colonies. Although he tried to rely on little foreign aid, when necessary he relied on German aid instead of French aid. He was not part of all French alliances (notably not joining the African and Malagasy Union), and made significant connections with former British colonies (namely Nigeria) and the United States. However, he did sign a defense pact with the French and maintained active diplomatic relations throughout his tenure as president. The French were distrustful of Olympio and considered him to be largely aligned with British and American interests.

== Immediate preceding conditions ==
=== Togo–Ghana relations ===
Relations between the countries of Ghana and Togo (and between Nkrumah and Olympio) became very tense in 1962 with repeated assassination plots. Assassination attempts on both leaders were blamed on the other. Refugees and political dissidents from Ghana found refuge in Togo, while political dissidents from Togo found refuge in Ghana. After the Togolese Progress Party and the Juvento movement were implicated in a 1961 attempt on Olympio's life, many prominent politicians including Nicolas Grunitzky and Antoine Meatchi left the country and received welcome and support from Ghana. Similarly, political dissidents from Ghana had fled to Togo after attempts on Nkrumah's life. In 1961, Nkrumah warned Olympio of "dangerous international consequences" if the support for dissidents to his rule that were living in Togo did not cease, but Olympio largely ignored the threat.

=== Domestic support for Olympio ===
Despite the large electoral victory, Olympio's policies caused significant problems for many of his supporters. His insistence on budget austerity aggravated unionists, farmers, and educated youth who sought jobs in the public sector. In addition, he clashed with the Catholic authority in the country and exacerbated tensions between the Ewe and other ethnic groups. As political difficulties increased, Olympio became increasingly authoritarian by locking up political prisoners and intimidating or shutting down opposition parties. According to Frederick Pedler "He seems to have believed that if he swept away the politicians he could rely upon the good sense of ordinary honest people."

=== Togolese military relations ===
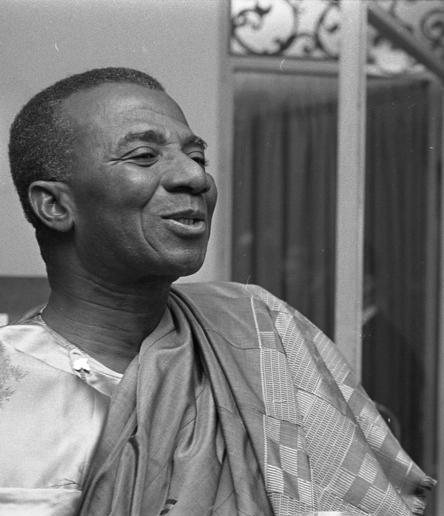
Sylvanus Olympio, the first president of Togo, was assassinated by military officers in the 1963 coup.

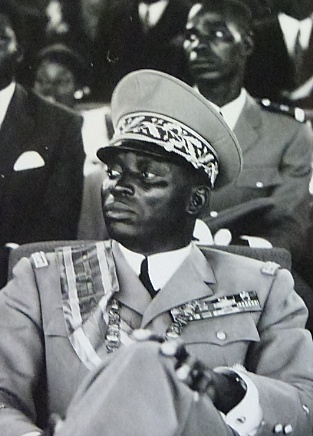
Étienne Eyadéma, who would become President of Togo from 1967 until 2005, was one of the major leaders of the 1963 coup.

Olympio had considered the military to be unnecessary in his efforts to develop and modernize the country and kept the military force small (only about 250 soldiers). However, as a result, troops who had left the French Army to return to their home in Togo were not provided with enlistment in the limited Togolese Armed Forces. Emmanuel Bodjollé and Kléber Dadjo, the leaders in the Togo military, repeatedly tried to get Olympio to increase funding and enlist more of the ex-French Army troops returning to the country, but were unsuccessful. On 24 September 1962, Olympio rejected the personal plea by Étienne Eyadéma, a sergeant in the French military, to join the Togolese military. On 7 January 1963, Dadjo again presented a request for enlisting ex-French troops and Olympio reportedly tore up the request.

== Coup ==
The military led by Emmanuel Bodjolle and Étienne Eyadéma met and agreed to remove Olympio from office. The coup began in the early morning hours of 13 January 1963 with shooting heard throughout the capital city of Lomé as the military attempted to arrest Olympio and his cabinet. Just before dawn, shots were heard outside of the United States Embassy which was close to the residence of Olympio. With the light of dawn, the dead body of Olympio was found three feet from the gate at the front of the embassy by the U.S. Ambassador Leon B. Poullada. It was claimed that when the soldiers attempted to arrest him in the streets of Lomé, he resisted and was shot in the process. Eyadéma claimed later that he was the one who pulled the trigger killing Olympio, but this is not clearly established. His body was taken inside the embassy and later picked up by his family.

During the coup, most of his cabinet were arrested but the interior minister and information minister were able to escape to the Republic of Dahomey and the health minister, Jerson Kprochtra, who was a member of Grunitzky's party, was not arrested.

The reasons given for the coup by the military leaders in a radio broadcast were economic problems and a failing economy. However, analysts often contend that the main roots of the coup were in the disgruntled ex-French soldiers who were unable to gain employment because Olympio kept the military small.

The military leaders quickly reached out to exiled political leaders Nicolas Grunitzky and Antoine Meatchi to head a new government as president and vice president, respectively. The two returned to the country and agreed to take leadership positions. The ministers in Olympio's cabinet who had been taken prisoner were released after the new government was established. However, it was reported that these ministers, led by Theophile Mally, attempted to reestablish rule by Olympio's party on 10 April 1963 and as a result they were arrested again.

Elections were organized in May 1963 and the only candidates were Nicolas Grunitzky and Antoine Meatchi who were elected as president and vice president of the country, respectively. The ministers who were arrested in the coup attempt in April were released after the election.

=== Account of assassination by U.S. Ambassador Leon B. Poullada ===
The U.S. Ambassador, Leon B. Poullada, provided the following account of the assassination of Olympio:

"Gunfire broke out in various parts of Lome at about 2 am. The shooting continued sporadically for several hours.
"Just before dawn an Embassy official who lives across the street from the Embassy building heard shouting and gunfire in front of the Embassy gate.
"When dawn broke, officials found Olympio dead on the ground. The body was moved into the Embassy building. Later members of the president's family—he had five children—took the body away."

— Leon B. Poullada

=== Account of assassination by Dina Olympio ===
After moving to the Republic of Dahomey right after the attack, Dina Olympio, the widow of Sylvanus Olympio (whom she called Sylvan), provided her account of the assassination:

"It was around 11:30 pm. Saturday when I was wakened by noises outside our house...All of a sudden they [the 70 soldiers] began shooting through our parlor door downstairs and then smashed through it with gun butts. About 1 a.m. they found four girls in the servant quarters and forced them upstairs at gunpoint to show them where we slept. Twelve militaries (soldiers) came up the stairs but Sylvan had already left. It is not true he fired at them when they came to the door. He had no pistol; his old hunting gun was in my room all the time. It is a complete lie that he shot...[the soldiers searched] as if they were looking for a needle. They even wanted to see under my bed...Just before six o'clock I went to the back of the house and looked out of the window to try to see our servant boy Bernard and see why he had left us women alone.
"When I opened the window I saw Sylvan...hunched over the wheel [of an official U.S. station wagon on the grounds of the American embassy]. Then I saw four soldiers between two embassy buildings. They saw him and Sylvan put up his hands like this and they grabbed him by his arms.
"I thought he was safe and I rushed downstairs and out the front door to try to get around the back and tell him he should go to the camp. Some soldiers stopped me but I ran past them and then I heard three or four shots—pah pah pah!
"I thought they might be shooting at our party supporters but I ran to the embassy gate and there was Sylvan lying on the ground with his eyes open and his intestines running out. I said 'Papa, Papa, speak to me,' but he did not."

— Dina Olympio

=== Account of Étienne Eyadéma ===
Eyadéma provided his account of the assassination claiming that he himself had pulled the trigger:

"I was the leader of the commando. It was not my intention to kill the president but to arrest him. When I knocked on his door, however, the president fired. I gave orders to my men to fire a burst into the air to show him we meant business.
[But Olympio leapt from the second floor of his house and hid until they found him]
"I ordered him out and told him to get dressed so we could take him. Then he tried to flee so we fired on him."
[A reporter asked "Who fired?"] "I fired."
"I would not have shot at him if he had not run. I arrested three other ministers and they are safe, although they carried pistols."

— Étienne Eyadéma

Although he also boasted about having personally killed Olympio to different media including Time and Paris-Match shortly after the coup, Eyadéma would deny responsibility decades later.

== Aftermath ==
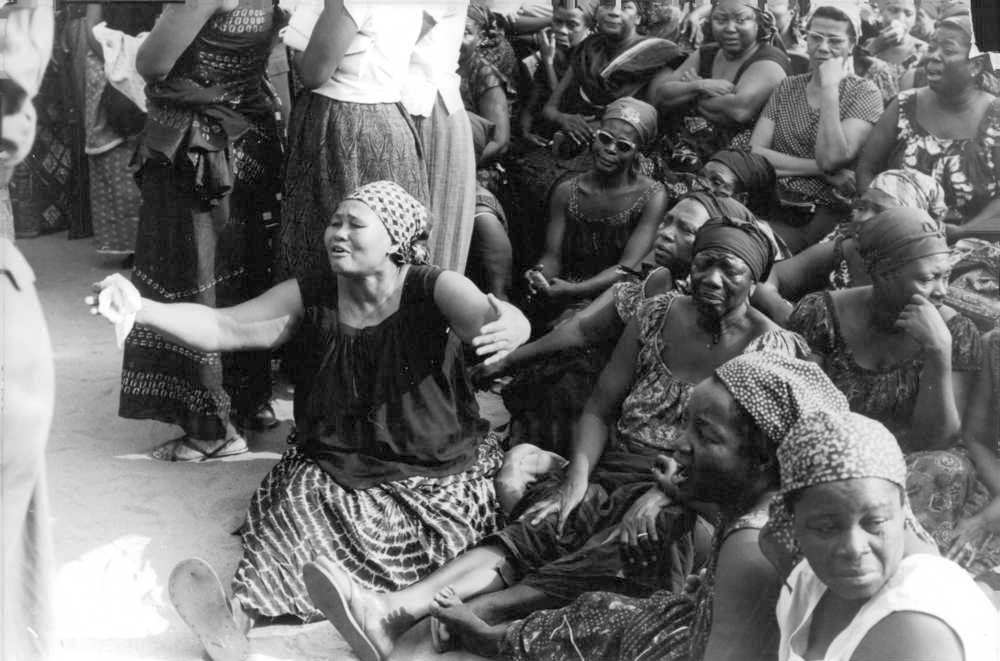
African women mourning the murder of president Olympio, 1963

As the first military coup d'état in the newly independent French and British countries of Africa, the event had a large impact throughout Africa and around the world. Multiple African countries condemned the attack and the event became a key lesson in the formation of the Organisation of African Unity (OAU), completed months after the coup. The charter of the OAU claims "unreserved condemnation, in all its forms, of political assassination, as well as of subversive activities on the part of neighboring States or any other State".

=== Togo ===
The official inquiry by the military officers claimed that Olympio had fired at the officers attempting to arrest him; however, his wife claimed that his only gun was inside the house when he was killed and that he had peacefully surrendered to the troops. There were multiple calls for independent inquiry into the murder, but these were foiled by the military and government of Grunitzky in Togo. His son attempted to get a UN inquiry the year after the assassination but the effort largely went nowhere.

Violence and resistance to the military was very limited with the largest protest coming after the elections in May 1963 in the town of Palimé. The military quickly increased its size, largely with French aid, to 550 men by the time of the May 1963 elections and to 1,200 by January 1966. Military power in Togo further increased with the 14 April 1967 coup d'état where Étienne Eyadéma deposed the government of Nicolas Grunitzky and ruled the country until 2005.

The Ewe people largely doubted the official story provided by Eyadéma and were largely excluded from positions of power with Grunitzky (who had a Polish father and an Atakpamé mother) and Antoine Meatchi (who was from the north of Togo) being from different ethnic groups. The Ewe people resisted the government with mass protests in 1967 opening the door for Eyadéma's coup on Grunitzky.

=== Ghana reaction ===
Because of the poor relations between the country, Nkrumah and Ghana were suspected to be involved in the coup and assassination. The Nigerian Foreign Minister Jaja Wachuku suggested immediately after the coup that the event was "engineered, organized, and financed by somebody." Wachuku also made clear that Nigeria would intervene if Ghanaian troops entered Togo in the crisis. Other governments and the press similarly wondered whether Ghana had actively supported the coup.

Ghana responded to the situation by denying any involvement in the coup or support in Antoine Meatchi return to Togo. The Ghanaian ambassador to the United States stated: "The Ghanan government does not believe in assassination in solving differences. It is believed that the unfortunate incident was purely an internal affair. The government of Ghana is deeply concerned with attempts of a section of the United Press to link Ghana with the recent unfortunate event in Togo."

The United States government made a statement that there was no clear evidence of Ghanaian involvement in the coup attempt. Nkrumah promised a delegation from the Republic of Dahomey that he would not interfere in the post-coup crisis.

=== United States reaction ===
Immediately after the fact, the White House released a statement saying that "The United States Government is profoundly shocked by the news of the assassination of President Olympio of Togo. President Olympio was one of Africa's most distinguished leaders and was warmly received here on his recent visit to the United States. The situation in Togo is unclear and we are watching it closely." A day later, President Kennedy's Press Secretary expressed that President Kennedy felt this was a "blow to the progress of stable government in Africa" and was "a loss not only for his own country but for all those who knew him here in the United States."

=== Reactions from Africa ===
Ghana and Senegal recognized the government immediately when it was established and the Republic of Dahomey recognized them as the de facto government. Guinea, Liberia, the Ivory Coast, and Tanganyika all denounced the coup and the assassination.

President William Tubman of Liberia contacted other African leaders wanting a collective lack of recognition of any government installed by the military after the coup. The government of Tanganyika (present-day Tanzania) called on United Nations action with the statement that "After the brutal murder of President Olympio, the problem of recognition of a successor government has arisen. We urge no recognition until satisfied first that the government did not take part in Olympio's murder or second that there is a popularly elected government."

Nigeria convened a meeting of the fifteen heads of state of the African and Malagasy Union and a few other interested states on 24–26 January 1963. The leaders were divided on the position to take and so they called on the interim Togo government to prosecute and execute the military officers responsible. However, Guinea and others were able to get agreement that the government of Togo would not be invited to the Addis Ababa Conference which formed the Organisation of African Unity in May 1963.
