= 1986 Togolese presidential election =

- 21 December 1986
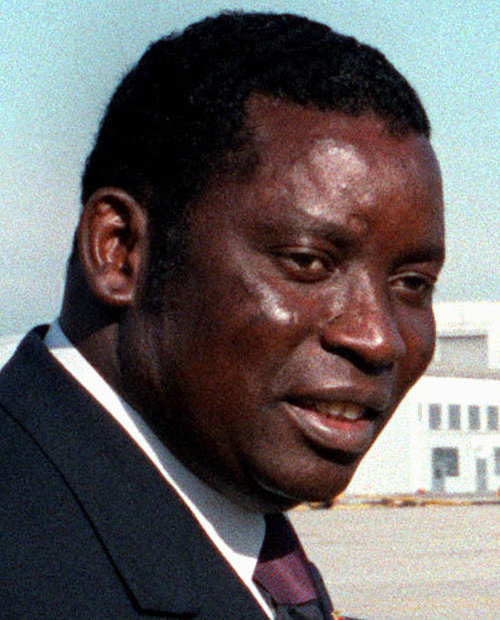
Nominee	Gnassingbé Eyadéma
Party	RPT
Popular vote	1,737,771
Percentage	100%
President before election
Gnassingbé Eyadéma
RPT
Elected President
Gnassingbé Eyadéma
RPT

Presidential elections were held in Togo on 21 December 1986. The country was a one-party state at the time, with the Rally of the Togolese People as the sole legal party. Its leader, incumbent President Gnassingbé Eyadéma, was the only candidate and was re-elected unopposed. Voter turnout was reported to be 99%.

== Results ==
Candidate	Party	Votes	%
Gnassingbé Eyadéma	Rally of the Togolese People	1,737,771	100.00
Total		1,737,771	100.00
Valid votes		1,737,771	99.95
Invalid/blank votes		840	0.05
Total votes		1,738,611	100.00
Registered voters/turnout		1,757,426	98.93
Source: Nohlen et al.
