= Véronique Massan Osséyi =

Togolese magistrate, politician and jurist

- Born: Massan Osseyi; 20 January 1942; Amou Oblo
- Died: 7 March 2010 (aged 68); Neuilly-sur-Seine
- Resting place: Amou-Oblo
- Alma mater: French National School for the Judiciary; University of Caen Normandy
- Occupation: Magistrate, judge, politician, minister
- Spouse(s): gnassingbé Eyadéma
- Children: Mey Gnassingbé
- Awards: Commander of the Order of Mono
- Position held: minister

Véronique Massan Osséyi, also known as Véronique Dagadzi, (c. 1940 – 7 March 2010 in Paris), was a Togolese magistrate, politician, and jurist. She was interested in the condition of women in Togo in her legal work.

Osséyi was also one of the wives of President Gnassingbé Eyadéma.

== Biography ==
She was born in 1940 or 1941 in northern Togo. She was the daughter of "Mama" Yawa Osséyi. She attended a high school in Lomé. Among her classmates were the writer Koffi Gomez and the pioneer of Togolese radio Charles Ameganvi. Osséyi then studied law in France, first at the University of Caen Normandy and later at the French National School for the Judiciary, in the 1970s. She obtained scholarships from the Togolese government at the time to support her studies.

Later, she became a judge in Lomé and then a renowned minister, also marrying Gnassingbé Eyadéma. Dagadzi was also a jurist who focused on the issue of women's roles in Togolese society. She was the mother of four children, including Mey Gnassingbé, and became a magistrate in 1972. During her career, she became commander of the Order of Mono and Grand Officer of the National Order of Merit.

She died on 7 March 2010 in Paris, and after a vigil at the Presbyterian Church of Lomé, Osséyi was buried in Amou Oblo in presence of the then President of the National Assembly, Abass Bonfoh.
