= Eugène Koffi Adoboli =

Togolese politician (1934–2025)

5th Prime Minister of Togo
- In office 21 May 1999 – 31 August 2000
- President: Gnassingbé Eyadéma
- Preceded by: Kwassi Klutse
- Succeeded by: Agbéyomé Kodjo

Personal details
- Born: 3 October 1934
- Died: 23 April 2025 (aged 90) Switzerland
- Political party: Rally of the Togolese People

Eugène Koffi Adoboli (3 October 1934 – 23 April 2025) was a Togolese politician. He was Prime Minister of Togo from 21 May 1999 to 31 August 2000. In 2011 he was sentenced to five years in jail in absentia stemming from an embezzlement scandal while he was Prime Minister.

== Life and career ==
Adoboli was named Prime Minister on 21 May 1999, replacing Kwassi Klutse. He had previously been an international civil servant at the United Nations Conference on Trade and Development (UNCTAD) in Geneva and the United Nations Joint Inspection Unit for over 40 years. At the time of his appointment by President Gnassingbé Eyadéma following the March 1999 parliamentary election, Adoboli was virtually unknown in Togolese politics. During his tenure, Adoboli faced criticism of his inability to improve Togo's economic position.

On 7 April 2000, the United Nations "Millennium Report" was officially launched in Lomé, personally sponsored by Adoboli and Cécile Molinier, the UN coordinator in Togo. Adoboli praised the report, stating, "And it was with the same attention that the President welcomed the Secretary-General's projects aimed at creating a 'world free from fear'." Adoboli met with Secretary General of the United Nations Kofi Annan on 9 July 2000. On 27 August 2000, Adoboli resigned as prime minister and Eyadéma accepted his resignation. Togolese Communication Minister Koffi Panou announced the move, which came a day after the legislature conducted a vote of no confidence against his government. Eyadéma appointed Agbéyomé Kodjo to replace Adoboli on 29 August.

Adoboli moved to Switzerland in 2002. He delivered a keynote speech to the World Meteorological Association in April 2010, encouraging the organization to improve climate information and climate services to African people and governments to reduce the impacts of natural disasters caused by climate change. Adoboli urged African countries to come together to face the looming climate issues.

In 2011, he was accused of embezzling 800 million CFA francs in a construction project in Lomé in 1999 while he was prime minister. The villas were intended to be used by leaders at a summit of the Organisation for African Unity. In July, he was one of three individuals sentenced to five years in prison in absentia for his role in embezzling the funds. Adoboli denied the accusation, stating, "At no time have I dipped into the accounts of the Togolese government. This judgement borders on the ridiculous and does not honour our country." Instead, he insisted that Togo owed him money.

Adoboli died while in exile in Switzerland, on 23 April 2025, at the age of 90.

Preceded by Kwassi Klutse	Prime Minister of Togo; 1999–2000	Succeeded by Agbéyomé Kodjo
