= 1993 Togolese presidential election =

- 25 August 1993
- Registered: 2,080,617
- Turnout: 36.12% (▼62.81pp)
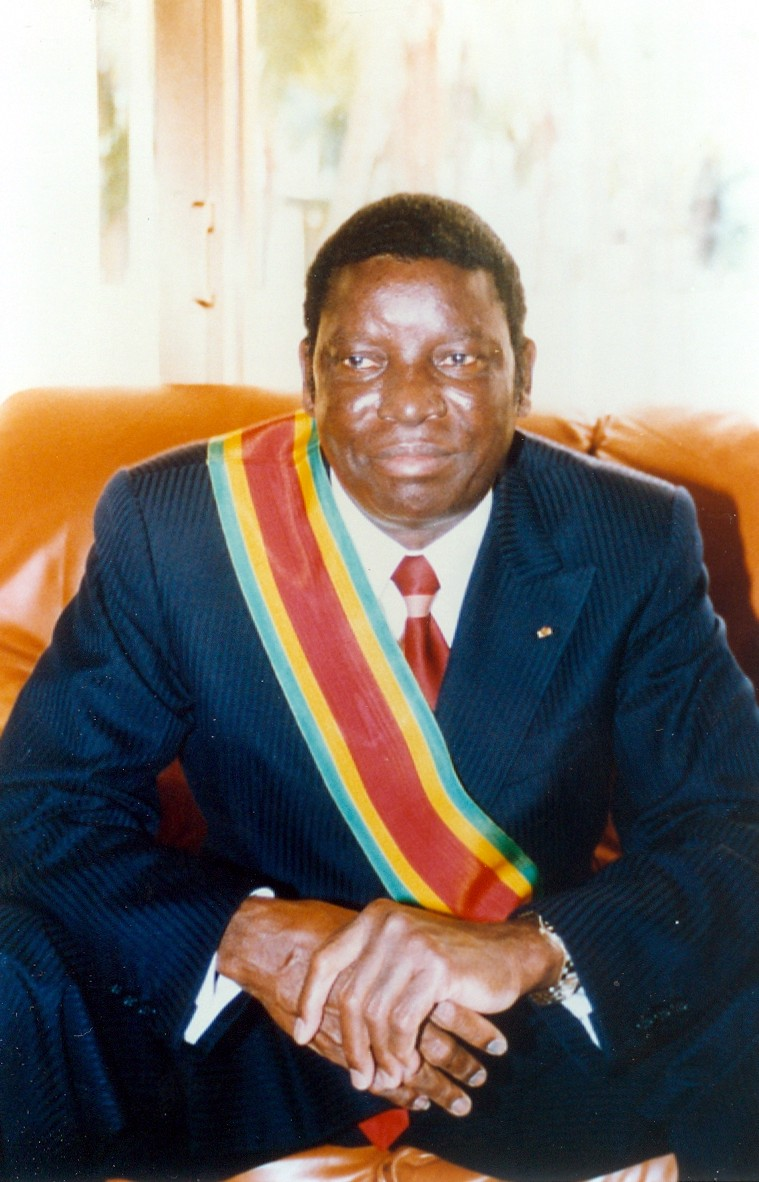

Nominee	Gnassingbé Eyadéma	Jacques Amouzou
Party	RPT	Independent
Popular vote	691,485	13,168
Percentage	96.42%	1.90%
- Results by region
President before election
Gnassingbé Eyadéma
RPT
Elected President
Gnassingbé Eyadéma
RPT

Presidential elections were held in Togo on 25 August 1993. They were the first presidential elections in the country to feature more than one candidate. However, the major opposition parties boycotted the election, and only two minor candidates ran against incumbent President Gnassingbé Eyadéma, who ultimately won over 95% of the vote. Voter turnout was reported to be just 36%.

== Results ==
The official results were inconsistent, with the total number of votes for candidates being ten votes lower than the number of valid votes, and the total of valid and invalid votes (762,593) being higher than the figure for total votes cast (751,495).

Candidate	Party	Votes	%
Gnassingbé Eyadéma	Rally of the Togolese People	691,485	96.42
Jacques Amouzou	Independent	13,632	1.90
Adani Ifé	Togolese Alliance for Democracy	12,011	1.67
Total		717,138	100
Valid votes		717,138	
Invalid/blank votes		45,455	
Total		751,495	100
Registered voters/turnout		2,080,617	36.12
Source: Journal Officiel
