= Kokou Agbemadon =

Togolese politician

Personal details
- Born: May 23 1951 Lomé
- Citizenship: Togo
- Party: RPT
- Occupation: Minister for Mines, Energy and Water from June 20, 2005

Kokou Solété Agbemadon (born May 23, 1951, in Lomé) is a Togolese politician of the Rally of the Togolese People (RPT).

== Political career ==
Agbemadon was the Minister for Mines, Energy and Water from June 20, 2005 until the next government was named on September 20, 2006.

He was the first candidate on the RPT's candidate list for Yoto Prefecture in the October 2007 parliamentary election, but all three seats in Yoto were won by the opposition Action Committee for Renewal (CAR).

Agbemadon was elected as a member of the RPT Central Committee from Yoto Prefecture at the party's 9th Congress in December 2006.
