= Youth of the Rally of the Togolese People =

Youth of the Rally of the Togolese People (in French: Jeunesse du Rassemblement du Peuple Togolais) was the youth wing of the dominant political party in Togo, the Rally of the Togolese People (RPT). JRPT was founded in 1972.
