= Coordination of New Forces =

Political party in Togo

Coordination of New Forces (French: Coordination des Forces Nouvelles, CFN) is a political party in Togo led by Joseph Kokou Koffigoh.

== History ==
The CFN was initially a coalition composed of three political parties—the Democratic Union for Renewal (UDR), the Socio-Liberal Party of Togo (SOLITO) and the Alliance for the Renewal of the Nation (ARENA)—along with three associations—BASE, CODEPO, UNIFED— and led by Koffigoh, who was then transitional Prime Minister. It held its constitutive assembly on 11 June 1993 at the Palais des Congrès in Lomé. In the February 1994 parliamentary elections the CFN won only one seat, and Koffigoh resigned as Prime Minister in March 1994. The CFN failed to win a seat in the March 1999 parliamentary elections, and boycotted the October 2002 parliamentary elections. In ran in the October 2007 parliamentary elections, but received just 0.09% of the vote and again failed to win a seat.
