= Joseph Kokou Koffigoh =

Togolese politician and former Prime Minister

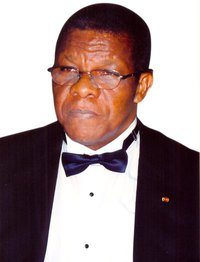

2nd Prime Minister of Togo
- In office 27 August 1991 – 23 April 1994
- President: Gnassingbé Eyadéma
- Preceded by: Office Reestablished
- Succeeded by: Edem Kodjo

Personal details
- Born: 1948 (age 77–78)
- Party: CFN
- Occupation: Activist

Joseph Kokou Koffigoh (born 1948) is a Togolese politician, human rights activist, and a poet who served as Prime Minister of Togo from 27 August 1991 to 23 April 1994. Elected as prime minister by the opposition-dominated National Conference in 1991, Koffigoh was given full executive powers and tasked with overseeing a transition to multiparty elections. Beginning in December 1991, however, President Gnassingbé Eyadéma increasingly reasserted his authority at Koffigoh's expense. Although Koffigoh remained in office, the opposition eventually abandoned him, feeling he had become too cooperative with Eyadéma.

Koffigoh has been the president of the Coordination of New Forces (CFN) since 1993. He was replaced as prime minister after the 1994 parliamentary election, in which the CFN performed poorly, although Koffigoh himself won a seat in the National Assembly. Later, he was Minister of Foreign Affairs from 1998 to 2000 and Minister of Regional Integration, in charge of Relations with Parliament, from 2000 to 2002.

== Background and political career during the early 1990s ==
Koffigoh was born in Kpélé Dafo. He served as the head of Togo's Bar Association and in August 1990 he founded the first human rights organization in the country, the Togolese League of Human Rights (Ligue togolaise des droits de l'homme, LTDH), which quickly won support both at home and abroad. He was elected as prime minister by the National Conference on 27 August 1991; President Gnassingbé Eyadéma was stripped of his powers and was left as a ceremonial president. Koffigoh was tasked by the Conference with forming a transitional government leading to elections that were then planned to be held in 1992, in which neither Koffigoh nor Eyadéma were to be allowed to run. Although Eyadéma had sought to suspend the Conference, surrounding the venue with soldiers, he subsequently accepted Koffigoh's appointment. Aside from serving as prime minister, Koffigoh also became Minister of Defense. According to the opposition, Koffigoh's subsequent appointments of supporters and friends to head public enterprises led to some criticism and antipathy from other members of the opposition; he was accused of strengthening his own power base rather than the unity of the opposition, thus weakening the opposition in the ongoing struggle against Eyadéma.

In the months following his appointment, troops loyal to Eyadéma repeatedly tried to oust Koffigoh. On 1 October 1991, they seized the national radio and television station and demanded that Koffigoh resign before leaving the station; Koffigoh said afterwards on the radio that order was restored. A week later, they unsuccessfully tried to kidnap Koffigoh, and four people were reported killed in protests and violence that followed. After Eyadéma's party, the Rally of the Togolese People (RPT), was banned by the transitional High Council of the Republic (HCR) in November 1991, soldiers began a siege of Koffigoh's official residence in Lomé in late November, demanding that Koffigoh's government be replaced and threatening to "reduce the city to ashes"; they also demanded that the RPT be legalized again and that the HCR be dissolved. Koffigoh called for French military aid. Eyadéma publicly called on the soldiers to return to their barracks and expressed continued trust in Koffigoh, but also invited him to begin consultations on the formation of a new national unity government. Following Eyadéma's call, as well as talks between Eyadéma and Koffigoh and between Eyadéma and the soldiers, the soldiers lifted their siege after two days; however, they promptly resumed it. To appease the soldiers, Koffigoh offered to include supporters of Eyadéma in the government, but he refused to dissolve his government altogether, and he again called for French aid. The French government, traditionally an ally of Eyadéma and maintaining close ties to the latter through Jean-Christophe Mitterrand, declined to intervene.

On 3 December 1991, soldiers succeeded in capturing Koffigoh in a heavy assault, involving tanks and machine guns, on his official residence. Many people were killed in this violence: at least 17, and possibly more than 200. The soldiers took Koffigoh to meet with Eyadéma, and later on the same day, Eyadéma released a statement saying that he and Koffigoh would form a new transitional government to replace Koffigoh's previous government. Although Eyadéma did not take responsibility for the soldiers' actions, he was widely believed to have behind them. Koffigoh said in a news conference that he was not being held prisoner and that he was working on "getting things back on track"; although he remained in office, his power was considered curtailed. On 31 December, a new government headed by Koffigoh, including three members of the RPT, was announced; most members of Koffigoh's previous government remained, and Koffigoh himself continued to serve as Minister of Defense.

The transitional period, which was originally set to end in August 1992, was extended at that point to 31 December 1992. Koffigoh dissolved his government on 1 September 1992, although it remained in place in a caretaker capacity; he and Eyadéma agreed on 2 September to holding elections—local, parliamentary, and presidential, along with a constitutional referendum—in stages before the end of the year. Koffigoh formed a new government on 14 September, with 18 ministers, including six from the RPT. On 9 November 1992, he dismissed two RPT members of the government, Minister of Territorial Administration and Security Agbéyomé Kodjo and Minister of Communications and Culture Benjamin Agbéka, but Eyadéma prevented their dismissal. A rally in support of Koffigoh, who said that he would appeal the matter to the Supreme Court, was held in Lomé on 11 November. The opposition called a strike in the same month, but on 29 December Koffigoh called for the strike to end; as a result the Collective of Democratic Opposition-2 refused to participate in talks with Koffigoh on 3 January 1993. Eyadéma reappointed Koffigoh as prime minister later in the month, although the opposition and the HCR disputed this on the grounds that only the HCR had the right to appoint the Prime Minister. Having adopted a more cooperative attitude towards Eyadéma, Koffigoh became the subject of opposition criticism.

The Coordination of New Forces was established in 1993 as a six-party coalition, led by Koffigoh. In the second round of the February 1994 parliamentary election, Koffigoh was elected to the National Assembly as the UDR/CFN candidate in the Third Constituency of Kloto Prefecture. He was the only CFN candidate to win a seat. Following the election, he resigned as prime minister, along with his government, on 21 March 1994. Eyadéma appointed Edem Kodjo to replace Koffigoh as prime minister in April, and Kodjo succeeded Koffigoh in office on 25 April. In the National Assembly, Koffigoh was considered a reliable ally of the RPT during the parliamentary term that followed the 1994 election.

The years of the power struggle between Eyadéma and Koffigoh saw increased violent repression. Troops loyal to Eyadéma carried out systematic extrajudicial executions, arbitrary arrests and torture, as well as opening fire on a peaceful demonstration in January 1993. Commenting on this repression, Amnesty International spoke of "feelings of impunity" which had been "enforced by support from foreign governments, notably the authorities in France".

== Political career after 1994 ==
In 1997, Koffigoh was chairman of the organizing committee of the ACP-EU roundtable conference that was held in Lomé. Koffigoh subsequently became Minister of State for Foreign Affairs and Cooperation in the government named on 1 September 1998. As Foreign Minister, he headed peace talks in Lomé between the government of Sierra Leone and rebels of the Revolutionary United Front in mid-1999. Koffigoh served as Foreign Minister until he became Minister of Regional Integration, in charge of Relations with Parliament, in the government named on 8 October 2000. He served in the latter position until December 2002.

Following the April 2005 presidential election, in which Eyadéma's son Faure Gnassingbé was officially elected president but which the opposition denounced as fraudulent, serious violence broke out in Togo. On 25 May 2005, Gnassingbé created a special 10-member commission of inquiry to examine the violence and deliver findings about it within three months, and he appointed Koffigoh as the head of the commission. The commission eventually delivered its report on 10 November 2005. The report cast blame for the violence widely; it included criticism of the government, the opposition, and the media, placed the death toll at 154, and gave recommendations for improving the electoral process.

Koffigoh remains President of the CFN as of 2007. In the October 2007 parliamentary election, he was the first candidate on the CFN's candidate list in Kloto Prefecture, but the party did not win any seats in the election.

In November 2010, Koffigoh served as head of the African Union observer mission on the presidential election in Côte d'Ivoire. Koffigoh's report was highly critical of irregularities and shortcomings in the electoral process in the north of the country and documented significant abuses in regions held by former rebel troops. Nevertheless, Koffigoh attended the disputed inauguration of the incumbent president Laurent Gbagbo in a private, non-official capacity, leading the African Union to distance itself from him.

In recent years, Koffigoh has embraced poetry, publishing 4 collections whose topics generally celebrate Togolese and African cultures, and explore challenges facing the African continent.

In March 2025 Koffigoh was appointed to the Senate of Togo by the Togolese president.

Preceded by post created	Prime Minister of Togo; 1991–1994	Succeeded by Edem Kodjo
