= 1998 Togolese presidential election =

- 21 June 1998
- Registered: 2,273,190
- Turnout: 69.81% (▲33.69pp)
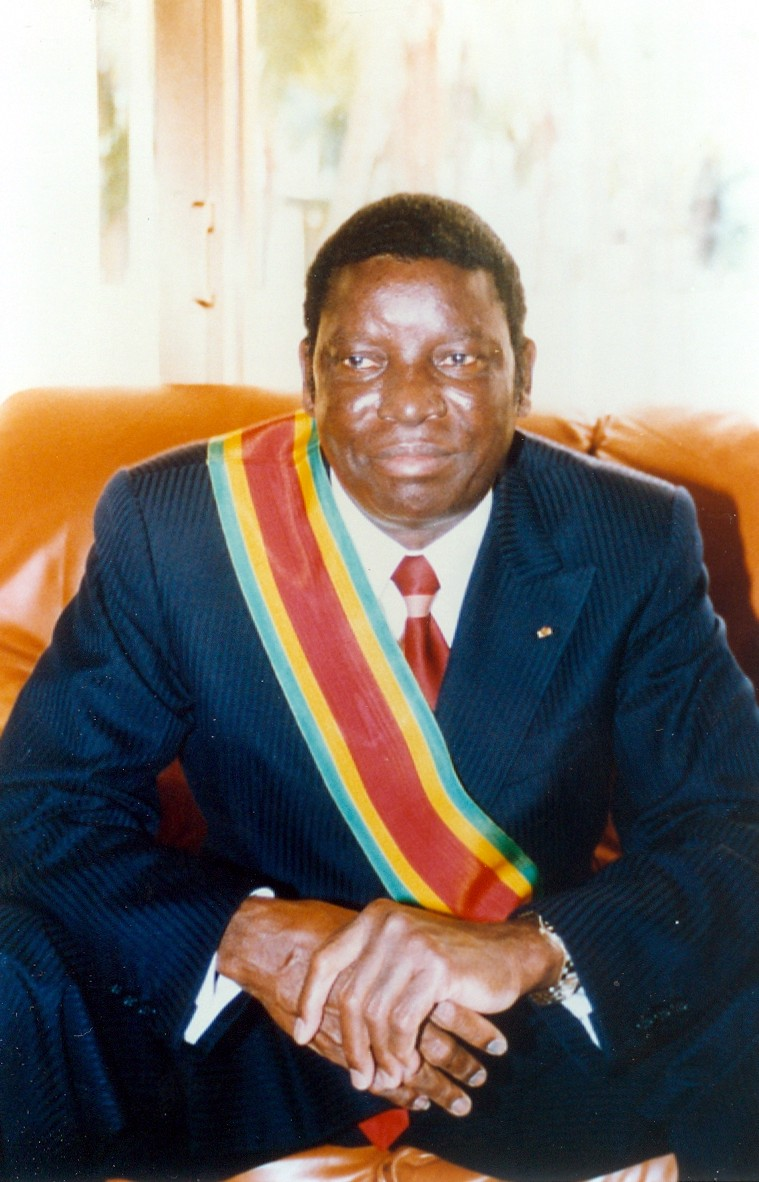

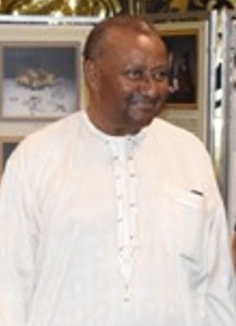
Nominee	Gnassingbé Eyadéma	Gilchrist Olympio	Yawovi Agboyibo
Party	RPT	UFC	ACR
Popular vote	811,837	532,771	149,006
Percentage	52.08%	34.18%	9.56%
- Results by region
President before election
Gnassingbé Eyadéma
RPT
Elected President
Gnassingbé Eyadéma
RPT

Presidential elections were held in Togo on 21 June 1998. Incumbent President Gnassingbé Eyadéma, in power since 1967, was re-elected with 52% of the vote according to official results. The opposition disputed this and claimed that Gilchrist Olympio of the Union of the Forces of Change (UFC) had won.

== Campaign ==
Léopold Gnininvi of the Democratic Convention of African Peoples (CPDA) was the first declared candidate in the election, followed by Eyadéma, the candidate of the Rally of the Togolese People (RPT), and Yawovi Agboyibo of the Action Committee for Renewal (CAR).

== Results ==
The Constitutional Court declared the final results on 10 July 1998. Eyadéma was sworn in on 24 July at a ceremony in the National Assembly, which was boycotted by the opposition.

Candidate	Party	Votes	%
Gnassingbé Eyadéma	Rally of the Togolese People	811,837	52.08
Gilchrist Olympio	Union of Forces for Change	532,771	34.18
Yawovi Agboyibo	Action Committee for Renewal	149,006	9.56
Zarifou Ayéva	Party for Democracy and Renewal	47,078	3.02
Léopold Gnininvi	Democratic Convention of African Peoples	12,715	0.82
Jacques Amouzou	Union of Independent Liberals	5,461	0.35
Total		1,558,868	100.00
Valid votes		1,558,868	98.23
Invalid/blank votes		28,159	1.77
Total votes		1,587,027	100.00
Registered voters/turnout		2,273,190	69.81
Source: African Elections Database
