= Emany Mata Likambe =

Congolese diplomat

Ambassador to Poland
- In office 1992–1994
- President: Mobutu Sese Seko

Personal details
- Born: 10 September 1933 (age 92) Leopoldville, Belgian Congo

Emany Mata Likambe (born 10 September 1933) is a Congolese diplomat and a former Ambassador to Poland, who came to international attention when it was discovered that he was homeless and living on the streets of Warsaw in 1994, the government of Zaire having failed to pay him for over two years.

== Education ==
Likambe received a bachelor's degree in business management from the College St. Joseph in Brussels, Belgium. Likambe can speak Lingala, Swahili, French and English.

== Career ==
Likambe started his career as a Secretary of the Minister Council of Zaire in 1960. He later transferred to the Zaire foreign ministry in 1961, serving until 1962. Then in 1963, he became director of the European Office of Zaire Press Agency in Belgium. Likambe served as Counsellor for the Permanent Mission of Zaire to the United Nations starting in 1973. Likambe came into conflict with the New York police department when his car was towed. In the 1980s, Likambe was a member of Zaire's embassy to the Soviet Union before he and two other diplomats were expelled in 1987, in retaliation for Zaire expelling three Soviet diplomats.

== Ambassador to Poland ==
Likambe became Zaire's ambassador to Poland in 1992, at a time when Zaire's economy was struggling and there was little funding available for diplomats. By early 1994, Likambe's funds had run out and he was ejected from his flat. The Embassy of Zaire stopped paying rent, and Likambe ran up bills at local hotels, which he failed to pay. After selling his car and personal belongings to keep the embassy running, Likambe eventually became homeless and lived at the Warsaw railway station. The Polish authorities did not discover his situation until November 1994, after he was attacked by other homeless people who stole his glasses. Afterwards the Polish government rented him an apartment. Jan Karczewski, a Polish Foreign Ministry spokesman stated, "We invited him to all official receptions to help him to eat."
