= 1974 Togolese Air Force C-47 crash =

1974 aviation accident in Togo

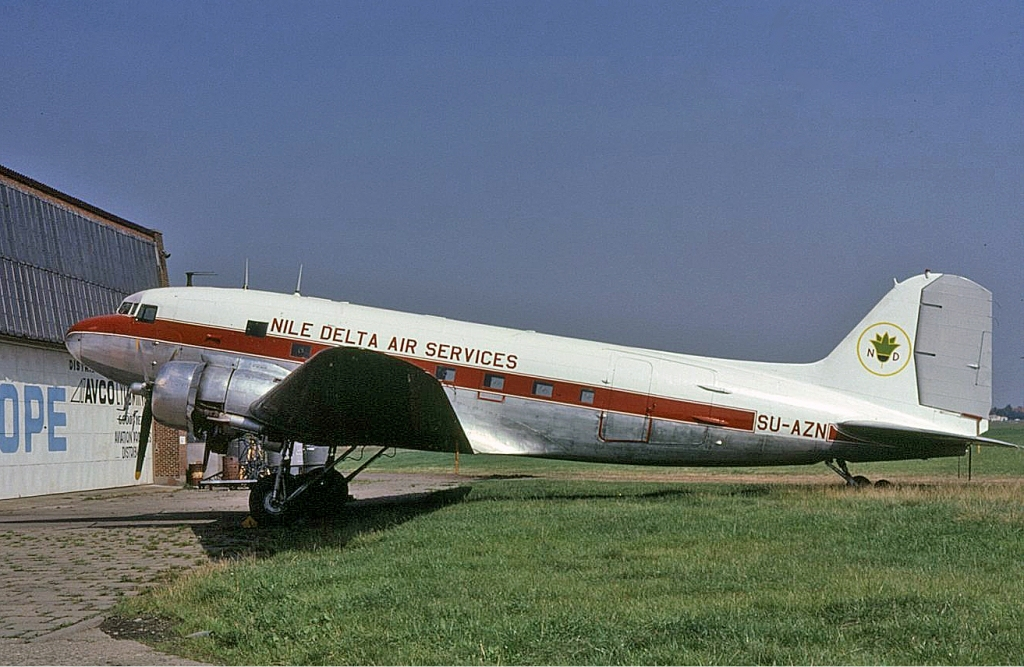
- A Douglas C-47 Skytrain, similar to the accident aircraft

Accident
- Date: 24 January 1974
- Summary: Crashed on approach for undetermined reasons
- Site: Near Sarakawa, Togo; 9°38′N 1°01′E

Aircraft
- Aircraft type: Douglas C-47 Skytrain
- Operator: Togolese Air Force
- Registration: 5V-MAG
- Flight origin: Lomé, Togo
- Destination: Pya, Togo
- Passengers: 7+
- Crew: 1–2
- Fatalities: 3–7
- Injuries: Several
- Survivors: 5+

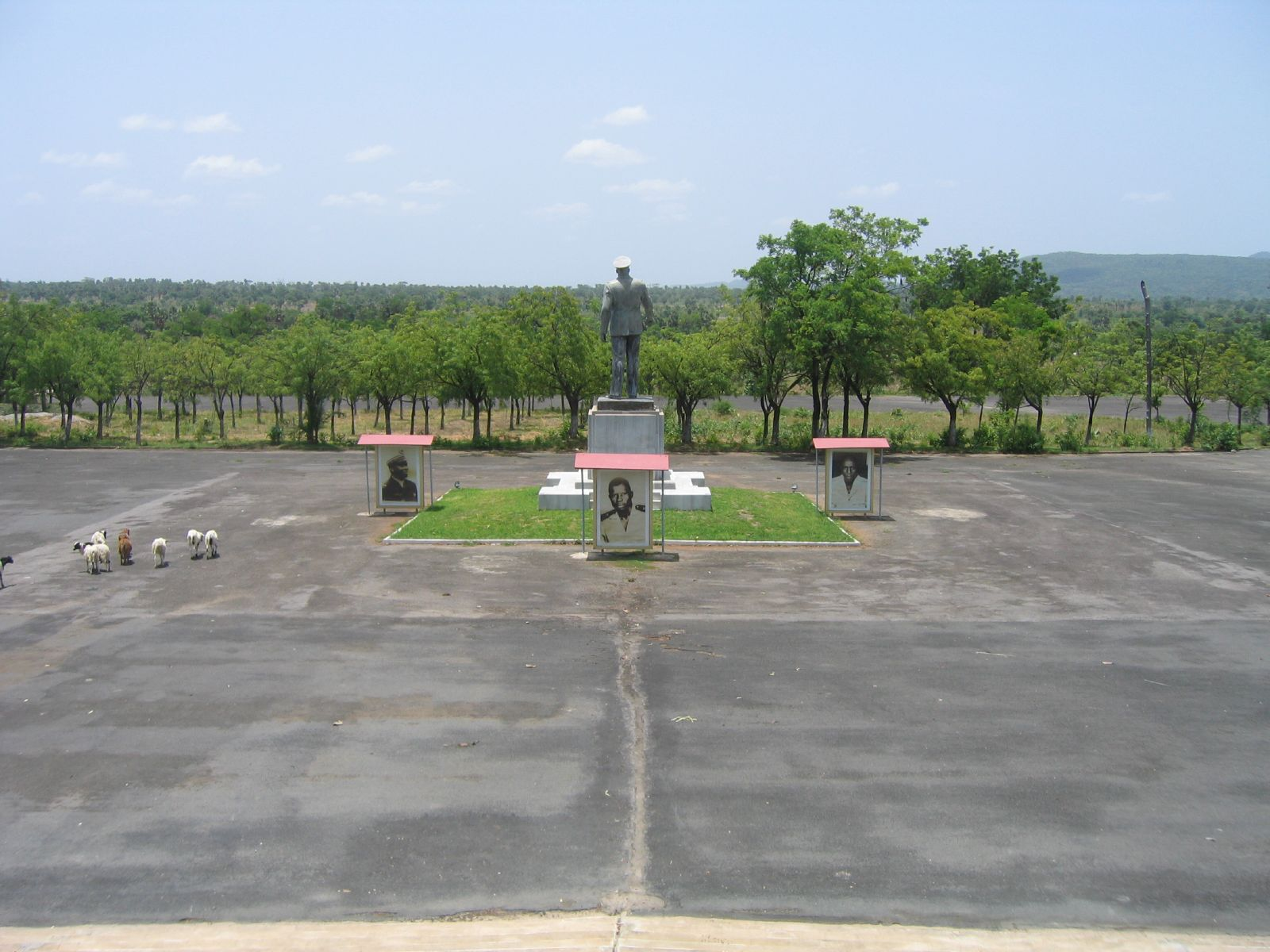
Monument to the crash

On 24 January 1974, a Togo Air Force Douglas C-47 Skytrain carrying several notable political figures crashed at an isolated location near the village of Sarakawa in northern Togo. Gnassingbé Eyadéma, the President of Togo, was on board the aircraft, which was flying from Lomé to his native village, Pya. As the C-47 descended for landing, it crashed near Sarakawa. According to one account, Eyadéma survived, but his French pilot and three other passengers died.

Another account of the crash was given by survivor Pastor François Roux, who mentioned two pilots and more than seven passengers, including Yaya Malou and Alidou Djafalo, the ministers for education and health. Both ministers survived the crash. According to Roux, four people died instantly (including the two pilots), while three more would succumb to their injuries afterwards, bringing the total number of fatalities to seven.

Eyadéma, who reportedly emerged from the crash with only minor injuries and refused medical treatment, claimed the aircraft had been sabotaged after he had reneged on an agreement with a French company over the use of a phosphate mine. Eyadéma attributed his survival to mystical powers and declared 24 January to be "Economic Liberation Day." Eyadéma even changed his first name from Étienne to Gnassingbé to remember the date of the day he survived the crash.

Following the incident, a monument was established by the Togolese government near the crash site. The monument features a statue of Eyadéma standing on a plinth, flanked by images of his generals who died in the crash.

Eyadéma was not the sole survivor of the crash, but he deliberately misrepresented the details of the accident to make himself look like a hero with superhuman strength who miraculously survived the disaster when everyone else was killed. Eyadéma claimed that the crash was not an accident but was a conspiracy to kill him, plotted by French imperialists who did not like his plan (announced on 10 January 1974) to nationalize the important phosphate mining company, the Togolese Mines Company of Benin (French: Compagnie Togolaise des Mines du Bénin (CTMB or Cotomib)). His C-47 was replaced by a new presidential jet, a Gulfstream II (registered as 5V-TAA) which was itself damaged beyond repair in a crash on 26 December of the same year, which killed three members of the crew, but which all three of the passengers on board survived. Eyadéma was not on board the jet at the time.
