= 1994 Togolese parliamentary election =

- 6 February 1994
- All 81 seats in the National Assembly; 41 seats needed for a majority
- Turnout: 65.10% (▼13.57pp)
Party	Leader	Seats	+/–
CAR	Yawovi Agboyibo	36	New
RPT	Gnassingbé Eyadéma	35	−42
UTD	Edem Kodjo	7	New
UJD		2	New
CFN	Joseph Kokou Koffigoh	1	New
This lists parties that won seats. See the complete results below.
Prime Minister before	Prime Minister after
Joseph Kokou Koffigoh; CFN	Edem Kodjo; UTD

Parliamentary elections were held in Togo on 6 February 1994, with a second round on 18 March in 24 constituencies. The first multi-party elections since the 1960s, they saw the ruling Rally of the Togolese People (RPT) finish second behind the Action Committee for Renewal (CAR), who together with their allies the Togolese Union for Democracy (UTD), gained a majority in the National Assembly.

== Results ==
Party	Votes	%	Seats	+/–
Action Committee for Renewal			36	New
Rally of the Togolese People			35	–42
Togolese Union for Democracy			7	New
Union for Justice and Democracy			2	New
Coordination of New Forces			1	New
Total			81	+4
Valid votes	1,263,334	97.12		
Invalid/blank votes	37,407	2.88		
Total votes	1,300,741	100.00		
Registered voters/turnout	1,998,051	65.10		
Source: Nohlen et al.

== Aftermath ==
Following the elections, the RPT lodged a complaint with the Supreme Court, resulting in invalidation of three seats (two won by the CAR and one by the UTD). Nevertheless, they maintained a majority in the Assembly, and nominated CAR leader Yawovi Agboyibo for the post of Prime Minister. However, RPT leader President Gnassingbé Eyadéma refused to accept the nomination, and instead appointed UTD leader Edem Kodjo. As a result, the CAR pulled out of their alliance with the UTD, and were replaced in government by the RPT.

By-elections for the invalidated three seats were held in August 1996, with all three seats won by the RPT.
