= Vice President of Togo =

Vice President of Togo (French: Vice-président de la République togolaise) is a former political position in Togo.

The Constitution of Togo of May 1963 established an executive branch of a President of Togo and a vice president. The National Assembly was left with weak powers. The Vice President was elected with universal suffrage. A constitutional amendment in December 1966 abolished the vice presidency.

== List of officeholders ==
No.	Portrait	Name (Birth–Death)	Term of office			President(s)	Ref.
No.	Portrait	Name (Birth–Death)	Took office	Left office	Time in office	President(s)	Ref.
1		Antoine Meatchi (1915–1984)	5 May 1963	December 1966	3 years, 6 months	Grunitzky	

== See also ==
- Vice President of Togo
- Prime Minister of Togo
- List of colonial governors of Togo
- Politics of Togo
