= 1979 Togolese general election =

- 30 December 1979
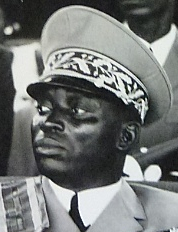
Nominee	Gnassingbé Eyadéma
Party	RPT
Popular vote	1,296,584
Percentage	100%
President before election
Gnassingbé Eyadéma
RPT
Elected President
Gnassingbé Eyadéma
RPT

General elections were held in Togo on 30 December 1979, alongside a constitutional referendum that confirmed the country's status as a one-party state. Gnassingbé Eyadéma, who had led a coup in 1967, was elected President unopposed, whilst the Rally of the Togolese People (the sole legal party) won all 67 seats in the National Assembly as its list of 67 candidates was approved by voters. Voter turnout was reported to be 99.3% in the parliamentary election and 99.4% in the presidential election.

== Results ==
=== President ===
Candidate	Party	Votes	%
Gnassingbé Eyadéma	Rally of the Togolese People	1,296,584	100.00
Total		1,296,584	100.00
Valid votes		1,296,584	99.98
Invalid/blank votes		267	0.02
Total votes		1,296,851	100.00
Registered voters/turnout		1,303,970	99.45
Source: Nohlen et al.

=== National Assembly ===
Party	Votes	%	Seats
Rally of the Togolese People	1,250,942	100.00	67
Total	1,250,942	100.00	67
Valid votes	1,250,942	96.65	
Invalid/blank votes	43,301	3.35	
Total votes	1,294,243	100.00	
Registered voters/turnout	1,303,970	99.25	
Source: Nohlen et al.
