= Rally of the Togolese People =

Ruling party of Togo from 1969 to 2012

Rally of the Togolese People Rassemblement du Peuple Togolais
- Leader: Gnassingbé Eyadéma (1969–2005); Faure Gnassingbé (2005–2012)
- Founder: Gnassingbé Eyadéma
- Founded: 1969; 57 years ago
- Dissolved: 2012; 14 years ago
- Succeeded by: UNIR
- Headquarters: Lomé, Togo
- Youth wing: Youth of the RPT (from 1972)
- Ideology: African nationalism Right-wing populism National conservatism Fascism; Economic interventionism Authoritarian conservatism (Togolese)
- Political position: Right-wing to far-right
- National Assembly (2007): 50 / 81 (62%)

The Rally of the Togolese People (French: Rassemblement du Peuple Togolais, RPT) was the ruling political party in Togo from 1969 to 2012. It was founded by President Gnassingbé Eyadéma and headed by his son, President Faure Gnassingbé, after the former's death in 2005. Faure Gnassingbé replaced the RPT with a new ruling party, the Union for the Republic (UNIR), in April 2012, dissolving the RPT.

== History ==
The RPT was founded in late 1969, under President Gnassingbé Eyadéma. The party's first Secretary-General was Edem Kodjo. It was the only legally permitted party in the country, a role further entrenched in a new constitution adopted in the 1979 referendum when all other parties were banned. The president of the party was elected to a seven-year term as president of the republic, and confirmed in office by a plebiscite.

After 22 years of single-party rule by the RPT, a National Conference was held from July to August of 1991, establishing a transitional government that reinstituted multiparty elections. The RPT was legally dissolved by the National Conference on 27 August 1991. After the party was banned in November 1991 by the High Council of the Republic (the transitional parliament), a political crisis occurred in which soldiers loyal to Eyadéma, who demanded that the ban on the RPT be lifted, captured Prime Minister Joseph Kokou Koffigoh in December. Koffigoh was released after agreeing to the soldiers' demands and forming a new government that gave a RPT member secondary responsibility for military affairs (while Koffigoh himself remained Defense Minister). Eyadéma remained President throughout the crisis.

In the parliamentary election held on 27 October 2002, the party won 72 out of 81 seats in the National Assembly of Togo. Following the death of Eyadéma in February 2005, the RPT designated his son, Faure Gnassingbé, as the party's leader and its candidate in the presidential election of 24 April 2005, in which he won 60.2% of the vote.

The RPT's 9th Congress was held in December 2006, and Solitoki Esso was elected as the party's Secretary-General for a three-year term. Previous Secretaries-General include Koffi Sama, elected in late 2000, and Dama Dramani, elected in late 2003.

The RPT won 50 out of 81 National Assembly seats in the October 2007 parliamentary election.

== Electoral history ==
=== Presidential elections ===
Election	Party candidate	Votes	%	Result
1972	Gnassingbé Eyadéma	867,941	99.9%	Elected ✓
1979	Gnassingbé Eyadéma	1,296,584	100%	Elected ✓
1986	Gnassingbé Eyadéma	1,737,771	100%	Elected ✓
1993	Gnassingbé Eyadéma	691,485	96.5%	Elected ✓
1998	Gnassingbé Eyadéma	811,837	52.1%	Elected ✓
2003	Gnassingbé Eyadéma	1,345,159	57.8%	Elected ✓
2005	Faure Gnassingbé	1,327,537	60.2%	Elected ✓
2010	Faure Gnassingbé	1,234,044	60.9%	Elected ✓

=== National Assembly elections ===
Election	Party leader	Votes	%	Seats	+/–	Position	Result
1979	Gnassingbé Eyadéma	1,250,942	100%	67 / 67	▲67	▲1st	Sole legal party
1985	Gnassingbé Eyadéma	1,024,533	100%	77 / 77	▲10	1st	Sole legal party
1990	Gnassingbé Eyadéma	1,175,602	100%	77 / 77	Steady	1st	Sole legal party
1994	Gnassingbé Eyadéma			35 / 81	▼42	▼2nd	Minority government
1999	Gnassingbé Eyadéma			79 / 81	▲44	▲1st	Supermajority government
2002	Gnassingbé Eyadéma			72 / 81	▼7	1st	Supermajority government
2007	Faure Gnassingbé	922,636	40.19%	50 / 81	▼22	1st	Majority government

== Notable politicians ==
- Kokou Agbemadon
