= Gnassingbé Eyadéma =

President of Togo from 1967 to 2005

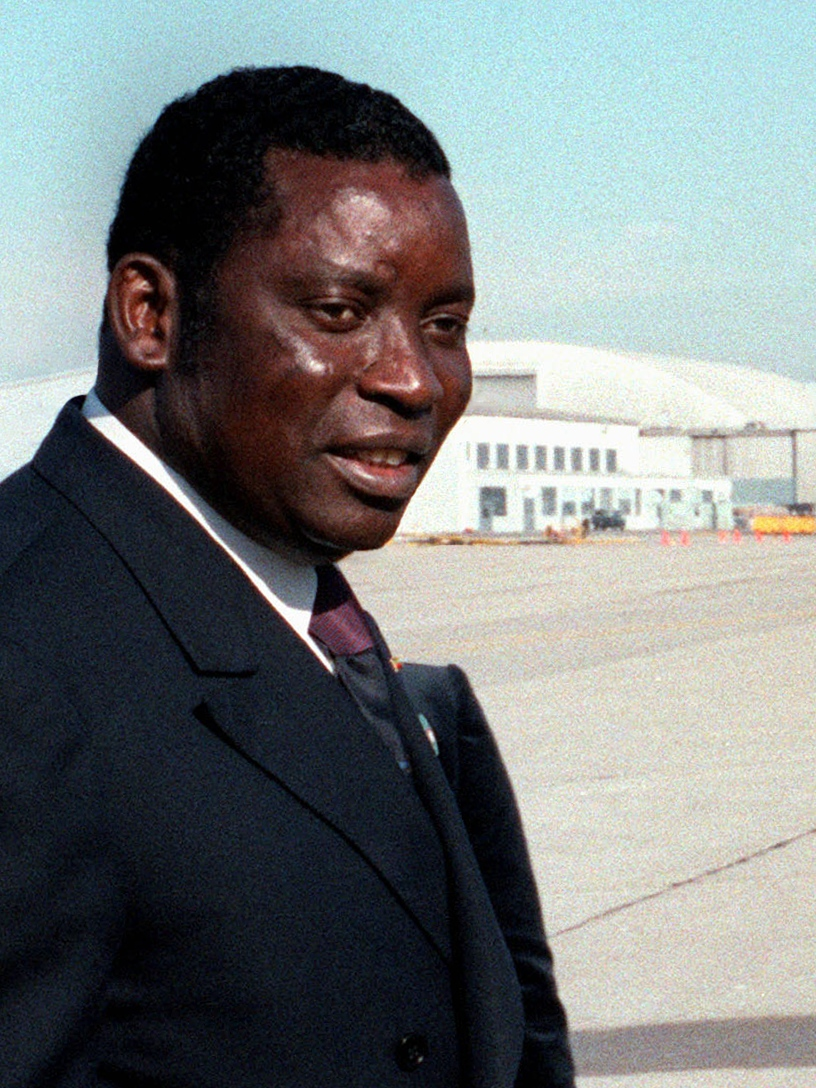
- Eyadéma in 1983

3rd President of Togo
- In office 14 April 1967 – 5 February 2005
- Prime Minister: Joseph Kokou Koffigoh; Edem Kodjo; Kwassi Klutse; Eugène Koffi Adoboli; Agbéyomé Kodjo; Koffi Sama
- Preceded by: Kléber Dadjo
- Succeeded by: Faure Gnassingbé

Chairperson of ECOWAS
- In office 7 July 1999 – 8 September 1999
- Preceded by: Abdulsalami Abubakar
- Succeeded by: Alpha Oumar Konaré
- In office 3 June 1980 – 2 April 1981
- Preceded by: Léopold Sédar Senghor
- Succeeded by: Siaka Stevens
- In office 9 November 1975 – 1 June 1978
- Preceded by: Yakubu Gowon
- Succeeded by: Olusegun Obasanjo

Personal details
- Born: Étienne Eyadéma Gnassingbé; 26 December 1935 Pya, French Togoland
- Died: 5 February 2005 (aged 69) near Tunis, Tunisia
- Party: RPT (from 1969)
- Spouse: Véronique Massan
- Children: Faure; Kpatcha

Military service
- Allegiance: Togo
- Branch/service: Togolese Armed Forces
- Years of service: 1958–1987
- Rank: Général de division

Gnassingbé Eyadéma (Note: French pronunciation: [ɲasɛ̃ɡbe ɛjadema]) (born Étienne Eyadéma Gnassingbé, 26 December 1935 – 5 February 2005) was a Togolese military officer and politician who served as the third president of Togo from 1967 until his death in 2005, after which he was immediately succeeded by his son, Faure Gnassingbé.

Eyadéma participated in two successful military coups, in January 1963 and January 1967, and became president on 14 April 1967. As president, he created a political party, the Rally of the Togolese People (RPT), and headed an anti-communist one-party state until the early 1990s, when reforms leading to multiparty elections began. Although his rule was seriously challenged by the events of the early 1990s, he ultimately consolidated power again and won multiparty presidential elections in 1993, 1998 and 2003; the opposition boycotted the 1993 election and denounced the 1998 and 2003 election results as fraudulent. At the time of his death, Eyadéma was the longest-serving ruler in Africa.

According to Anja Osei at the University of Konstanz, his rule "rested on repression, patronage, and a bizarre leadership cult."

== Early life and military career ==
Usually Eyadéma is said to have been born on 26 December 1935 in the northern quartiers of Pya, a village in the prefecture of Kozah in the Kara Region, to a peasant family of the Kabye ethnic group. But this date has been disputed. According to Comi M. Toulabor, Eyadéma's official date of birth is "based on a fertile imagination" and it would be more accurate to say that he was born around 1930. His mother was later known as Maman N'Danida, or Maman N'Danidaha.

In 1953, Eyadéma joined the French Army after completing primary school. He participated in the French Indochina War and the Algerian War.

Following nearly 10 years in the French army, Eyadéma returned to Togo in 1962. He was a leader in the 1963 Togolese coup d'état against President Sylvanus Olympio, who was assassinated during the attack. It has often been stated that Eyadéma himself committed the murder; shortly after the coup, Eyadéma himself told media including Time and Paris Match that he personally shot Olympio, although he denied responsibility decades later. On this occasion he helped establish Nicolas Grunitzky as the nation's new president.

Four years on, Eyadéma, having fallen out with Grunitzky, led a second military coup against the latter. This time there was no bloodshed (the deposed Grunitzky managed to escape to exile in Paris) and Eyadéma installed himself as president on 14 April 1967, in addition to awarding himself the post of Defence Minister. He held both offices for almost 38 years.

== Politics ==
According to Comi M Toulabor (researcher at the Centre d'études d'Afrique noire), Eyadéma "had been a personal friend of the French president, Jacques Chirac. He had remained in power for 38 years thanks to a couple of coups, systematic electoral fraud, the faithful allegiance of an army packed with supporters and members of his Kabye ethnic group, solid foreign support (especially from France), and adroit management of access to Togo's meagre economic resources." Three years after taking power, Eyadéma created the Rally of the Togolese People as the country's sole legal party. He won an uncontested election in 1972. In 1979, the country adopted a new constitution that returned the country (at least nominally) to civilian rule. The RPT was entrenched as the only party; the president of the party was automatically nominated for a seven-year term as president upon election to the party presidency and confirmed in office via an unopposed referendum. Under these provisions, Eyadéma was re-elected unopposed in 1979 and 1986. During his rule he escaped several assassination attempts; in 1974 he survived a plane crash in the northern part of the country near Sarakawa. After another unsuccessful assassination attempt by a bodyguard, he carried the bullet removed by the surgeon as an amulet.

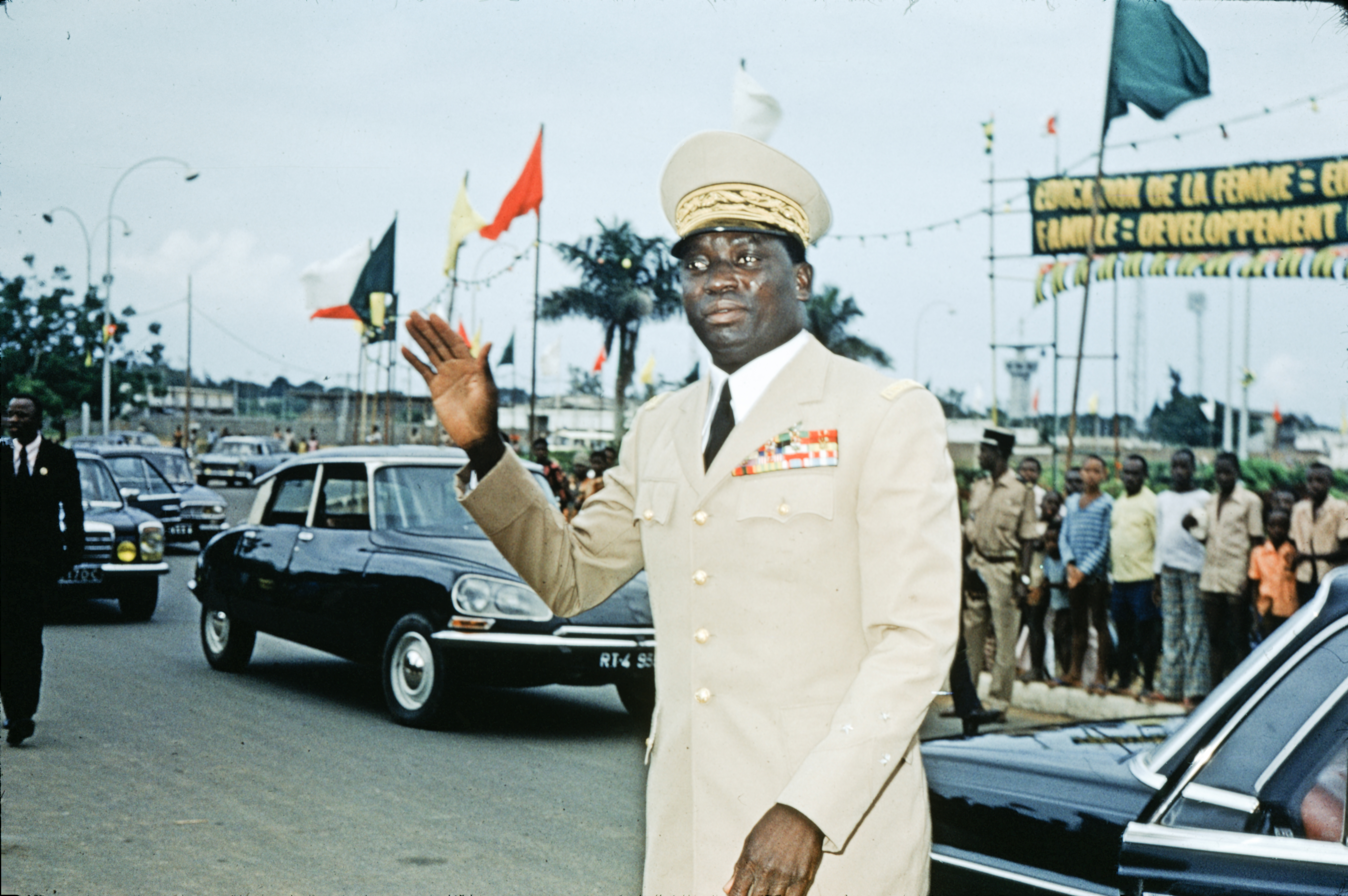
Eyadéma in Lomé, 1975

A national conference was held in August 1991, electing Joseph Kokou Koffigoh as Prime Minister and leaving Eyadéma as merely a ceremonial president. Although Eyadéma attempted to suspend the conference, surrounding the venue with soldiers, he subsequently accepted the outcome. Despite this, Eyadéma managed to remain in power with the backing of the army; Koffigoh had asked France for military support, but the French government (traditionally an ally of Eyadéma and maintaining close ties to the latter through Jean-Christophe Mitterrand) declined to intervene. Koffigoh was then captured by Togolese soldiers. A period of heavy political repression followed, with troops loyal to Eyadéma carrying out systematic extrajudicial executions, arbitrary arrests and torture, as well as opening fire on a peaceful demonstration in January 1993. Commenting on this increased repression, Amnesty International spoke of "feelings of impunity" which had been "enforced by support from foreign governments, notably the authorities in France".

In March 1993, an unsuccessful attack was made on the Tokoin military camp, where Eyadéma was living; several people were killed in the attack, including Eyadéma's personal chief of staff, General Mawulikplimi Ameji. He attempted to legitimize his rule with a multiparty presidential election in August 1993, which was boycotted by the opposition; facing only two minor challengers, he won 96.42% of the vote, although turnout was reportedly low outside of his native Kara Region. Eyadéma officially won re-election in the June 1998 presidential election, defeating Gilchrist Olympio of the Union of the Forces of Change (UFC) with 52.13% of the vote according to official results, amid allegations of fraud and accusations of the massacre of hundreds of government opponents. The European Union suspended aid in 1993 in protest of alleged voting irregularities and human rights violations.

In late December 2002, the Constitution was changed to remove term limits on the office of president. Previously, presidents had been limited to two five-year terms, and Eyadéma would have therefore been forced to step down after the 2003 election. With the removal of these limitations, however, Eyadéma was free to stand again and did so, winning the election on 1 June with 57.78% of the vote. He was sworn in for another term on 20 June. Another constitutional change was to reduce the minimum age of the president to 35 years, rather than 45.

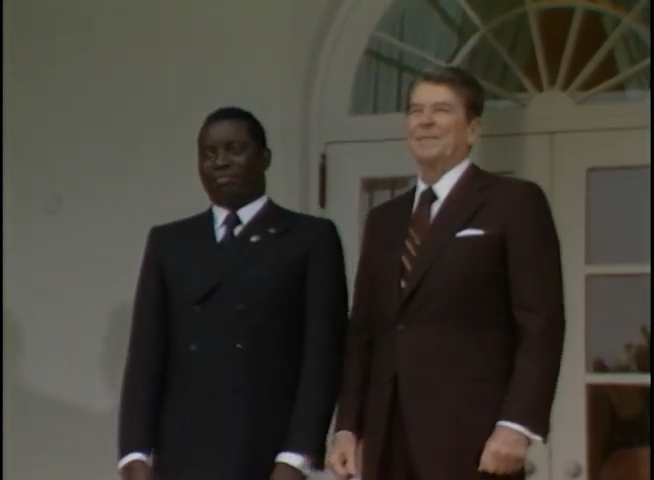
Eyadéma with President of the United States Ronald Reagan in the Rose Garden of the White House during a state visit in 1983

Eyadéma constructed a large palace near his family home in Pya a few kilometers north of Lama-Kara. He was the chairman of the Organisation of African Unity from 2000 to 2001, and he attempted, unsuccessfully, to mediate between the government and rebels of Ivory Coast in the First Ivorian Civil War, that began in that country in 2002.

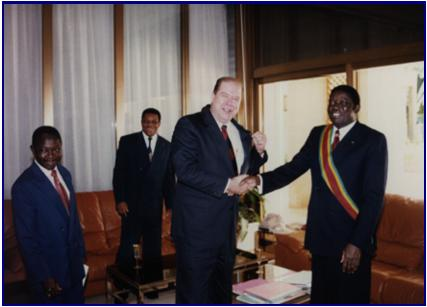
Former Arizona State Senator Billy Davis meeting with President Eyadéma in Lomé, 1993

The European Union sent a mission on 1 June 2004, to evaluate the state of democracy in Togo and to start a procedure of democratization of Togo. The expedition intended to open a dialogue between the state and the opposition. The team was supposed to meet with many politicians from other parties than Eyadéma's party, Rally of the Togolese People. But because of the criteria imposed by the government, politicians such as Gilchrist Olympio, Yawovi Agboyibo, and Professor Leopold Gnininvi boycotted the meeting. The European Union team cancelled the meeting since discussions with the government were almost impossible. The opposition party UFC wanted the release of 11 men held by the government. Finally, the European Union experts met each political figure individually and in private. The respect of human rights and of the press in Togo were to be investigated by the European Union experts.

According to BBC News, Eyadéma claimed that democracy in Africa "moves along at its own pace and in its own way."

== Personality cult ==
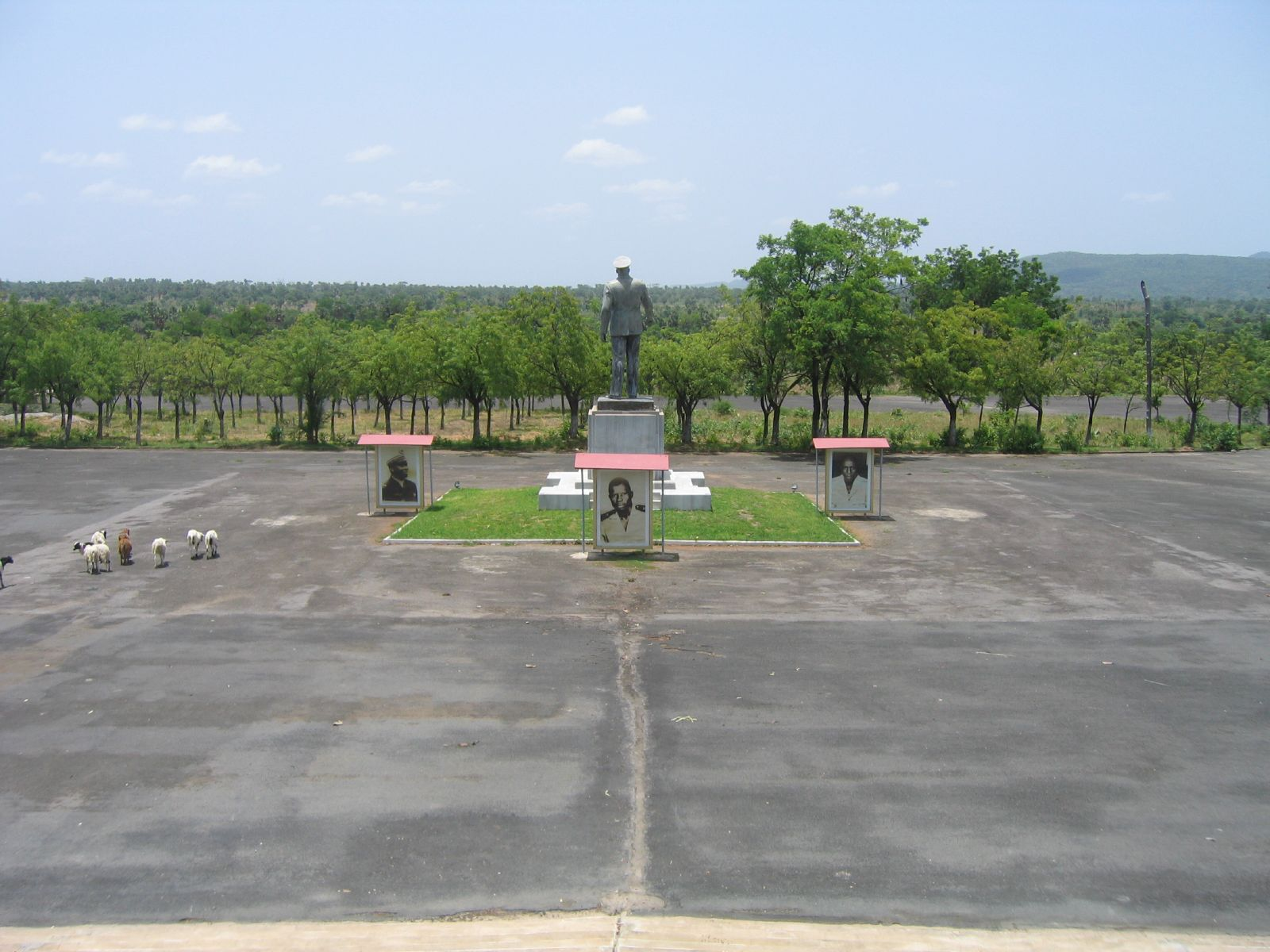
Monument to the 1974 presidential C-47 crash, which Eyadéma survived

Eyadéma had an extensive personality cult, including an entourage of 1,000 dancing women who sang and danced in praise of him; portraits which adorned most stores; a bronze statue in the capital city, Lomé; wristwatches with his portrait, which disappeared and re-appeared every fifteen seconds; and a comic book that depicted him as a superhero with powers of invulnerability and super strength. In addition, the date of a failed attempt on President Eyadéma's life was annually commemorated as "the Feast of Victory Over Forces of Evil."

Eyadéma even changed his first name from Étienne to Gnassingbé to note the date of the 24 January 1974 plane crash of which he was claimed to be the only survivor. In reality, he was not the sole survivor of the crash. There were other survivors, but he deliberately misrepresented the details of the accident to make himself look like a hero with superhuman strength who miraculously survived the disaster when everyone else was killed. Eyadéma claimed that the crash was not an accident and was in fact a conspiracy to kill him, plotted by imperialists who did not like his plan (announced two weeks before the crash) to nationalize the important phosphate mining company, the Compagnie Togolaise des Mines du Bénin (CTMB or Cotomib). His C-47 was replaced by a new presidential jet, Gulfstream II, which was again damaged beyond repair in a fatal accident in the same year. Eyadéma was not on board at the time.

== Death ==
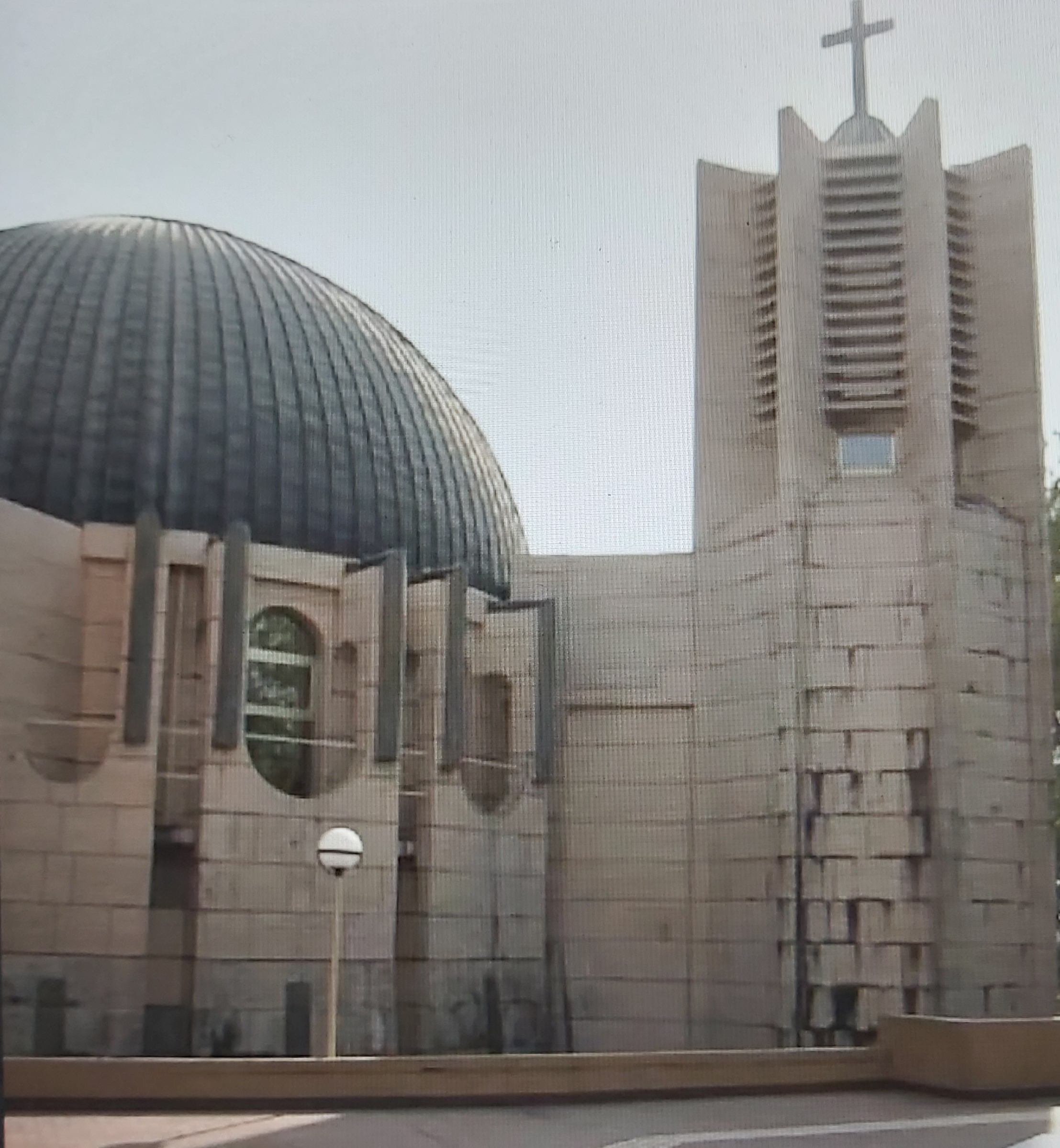
Mausoleum of Gnassingbé Eyadéma in his former residence in Pya, Kara, Togo.

On 5 February 2005, Eyadéma died on board a plane 250 kilometres (160 mi) south of Tunis, Tunisia. He died "as he was being evacuated for emergency treatment abroad", according to a government statement. Officials have stated that the cause of death was a heart attack. At the time of his death he was the longest-serving head of state in Africa.

Zakari Nandja, chief of the Togolese army, pronounced Eyadéma's son Faure Gnassingbé as the new president of Togo. Alpha Oumar Konaré, president of the Commission of the African Union, immediately declared this act to be a military coup d'état and against the constitution. ECOWAS also did not approve the designation of Faure Gnassingbé as president. Under heavy pressure from ECOWAS and the international community, Faure Gnassingbé stepped down on 25 February and was replaced by Bonfoh Abass, the first deputy parliament speaker, until after the presidential elections on 24 April 2005, when Faure Gnassingbé was elected president with 60% of the vote.

Eyadéma's funeral was held on 13 March 2005, in the presence of a number of presidents and other international dignitaries; Presidents Mathieu Kérékou of Benin, John Kufuor of Ghana, Laurent Gbagbo of Ivory Coast, Mamadou Tandja of Niger and Olusegun Obasanjo of Nigeria attended the ceremony. On 15 March, Eyadéma's family and the RPT party paid him a final homage in his hometown of Pya.

== Awards and decorations ==
- Togo:
  - Grand Cross of the Order of Mono
  - Grand Officer of the Order of Mono
  - Knight Grand Cross of the National Order of Merit
- Bavaria:
  - Bavarian Order of Merit (1984)
- Benin:
  - Grand Officer of the National Order of Benin
- France:
  - Knight of the Legion of Honour
  - Croix de guerre des théâtres d'opérations extérieures with Silver-gilt star (etoile en vermeil)
  - Combatant's Cross
  - Indochina Campaign commemorative medal
  - North Africa Security and Order Operations Commemorative Medal with ALGÉRIE gilt clasp
  - Overseas Medal with campaign clasp
- North Korea:
  - First Class of the Order of the National Flag (1974)
- Spain:
  - Collar of the Order of Civil Merit (1981)
- Yugoslavia:
  - Order of the Yugoslav Star

== In popular culture ==
He was portrayed by Ahmadou Kourouma in his novel Waiting for the Wild Beasts to Vote.

== See also ==
- Edem Kodjo (opposition politician and coalition leader)
- Agbéyomé Messan Kodjo
- History of Togo
- Politics of Togo

== Notes ==
Political offices
Preceded by Kléber Dadjo	President of Togo; 1967–2005	Succeeded by Faure Gnassingbé
New title	Chairman of the Economic Community of West African States; 1977–1978	Succeeded by Olusegun Obasanjo
Preceded by Léopold Sédar Senghor	Chairman of the Economic Community of West African States; 1980–1981	Succeeded by Siaka Stevens
Preceded by Abdulsalami Abubakar	Chairman of the Economic Community of West African States; 1999–2001	Succeeded by Alpha Oumar Konaré
Preceded by Abdelaziz Bouteflika	Chairperson of the African Union; 2000–2001	Succeeded by Frederick Chiluba
