= 2nd Parachute Chasseur Regiment =

- 2^{e} Régiment de Chasseurs Parachutistes
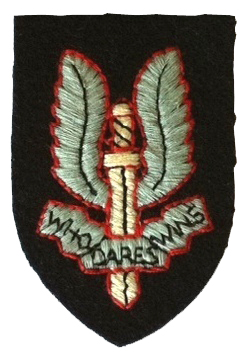
- Cloth insignia of SAS beret
- Active: 1943 - 1946
- Country: France
- Branch: French Army
- Type: Parachute Infantry
- Role: Infantry
- Motto: Who Dares Wins
- Engagements: World War II

Insignia
- Abbreviation: 2^{e} R.C.P.

The 2nd Parachute Chasseur Regiment (French: 2^{e} Régiment de Chasseurs Parachutistes) or 2^{e} RCP, is one of the most decorated French units of the Second World War, the only land unit awarded the red fourragère in that war, including six citations at the orders of the armed forces. The French Navy 1500-ton class submarine Casabianca also accumulated six citations at the orders of the armed forces and therefore its crewmen were entitled to wear the same fourragère.

The unit was commonly referred to in the British Armed Forces as the 4th SAS.

== Creation and naming ==
- 1 July 1943: creation of the 1st Air Infantry Battalion.
- 1 November 1943: renamed 4th Air Infantry Battalion.
- 1 April 1944: redesignated 4th SAS Regiment or 2nd Parachute Chasseur Regiment 2^{e} RCP in the French army.
- 30 September 1946: dissolution of the regiment.

== History, garrisons, campaigns and battles ==
=== World War II ===
==== Unit structure ====
The 1st Air Infantry Battalion (1^{e} B.I.A) was formed on 1 July 1943 in the Old Dean camp at Camberley from volunteers and from the 1st Air Infantry Company and 2nd Air Infantry Company (1^{e} C.I.A, 2^{e} C.I.A) formed on 15 September 1940. The unit notably deployed in Crete, Tunisia and Libya, winning a citation (Air Force).

The battalion joined the Free French Air Forces, which was entrusted to Commandant Pierre Fourcaud. At the time the battalion had 398 men, in four combat companies. These men then received parachute training at the Central Landing Establishment (C.L.E) of RAF Ringway.

The unit was renamed the 4th Air Infantry Battalion (4^{e} B.I.A) on 1 November 1943 and in February 1943 transferred to the command of Commandant Pierre-Louis Bourgoin, an amputee who had lost his arm during a reconnaissance mission in Tunisia. The 4^{e} B.I.A was joined with the 3rd Parachute Chasseur Regiment (3^{e} RCP) of Commandant Pierre Chateau-Jobert to form a demi-brigade commanded by Lieutenant-Colonel Durand.

Many French volunteers (244) followed a parachute training at the Air Instruction Center of the 1st Independent Polish Parachute Brigade at Upper Largo, in Scotland.

In April 1944, the B.I.A, who had in December 1943 joined their British and Belgian namesakes at the SAS Brigade of the Army Air Corps, were given their name and regimental designation: the 3^{e} and 4^{e} B.I.A became respectively the 3rd and 4th SAS regiments under the British and a little later, the 2nd (2^{e}) and 3rd Parachute Chasseur Regiment (3^{e}) under the French.

==== Operations in Brittany ====
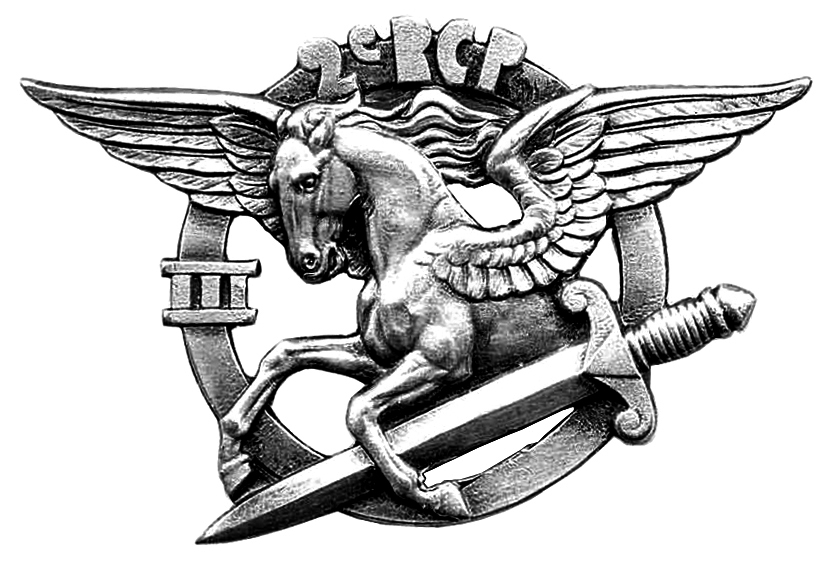
Insignia of the 3rd Battalion of the 2^{e}R.C.P

During the night of 5 to 6 June 1944, four SAS (36 men) respectively under the orders of Lieutenants Marienne, Henri Deplante, Botella and Deschamps took off in two four-engined Short Stirlings of the Royal Air Force with the destination of Brittany. The first two teams parachuted into the sector of Plumelec, 15 km from the Maquis de Saint-Marcel, Morbihan, the two other teams into the wooded forest of Duault in the Côtes-d'Armor. Their missions were to establish guerilla bases, respectively code named Operation Dingson and Operation Samwest.

Lieutenant Marienne's team was spotted. A large Georgian contingent encircled the team and during the skirmish which followed, corporal Emile Bouétard was wounded and killed. Bouétard was the first military casualty of "Operation Overlord".

During June and July, SAS paratroopers lived like hunters in the forest. Often, they mounted brutal attacks and fell back, going to ground camouflaged and blending into the forest the better to intervene at a more favourable opportunity. On the morning of 18 June, the camp of the SAS and the resistance was attacked. Following a day-long engagement, the French succeeded in retreating from Sérent and Saint-Marcel, blowing up their ammunition depot. At dawn on 12 July, enemy troops and militias managed to infiltrate to the command post of Lieutenant Marienne at Kerihuel, Plumelec where 18 men were posted, including paratroopers, maquis and farmers, who were machine-gunned and mutilated. The arrival on August 3 of the armoured brigades of General George S. Patton reached Rennes, brought this to a halt. The 4th SAS regiment (2^{e} RCP), lost (killed, wounded and prisoners) 23 officers and 195 men of 50 officers and 500 men (77 killed during the liberation of Brittany).

==== End operations ====
SAS battles often have unconventional outcomes. At Montceau-les-Mines, a group of paratroopers and a first section of the Free French Forces, tricked a much larger opposing force number into believing themselves surrounded by the manpower of a division. Accordingly, they managed to take back hundreds of prisoners, tanks and cannons. At the end of the campaign, the 3rd Parachute Chasseur Regiment (3^{e}RCP) had lost 80 of 400 soldiers. In their time of existence, the regiment put thousands of opposing forces out of combat, along with some 383 vehicles.

On Christmas Day 1944, the paratroopers of the SAS fought in the Belgian Ardennes, in Operation Von Rundstedt. On 11 November 1944, the men of the 2nd Parachute Chasseur regiment received from the hands of Général Charles de Gaulle the Croix de la Libération.

In WW2, French SAS parachutists trained in the United Kingdom wore the black beret, and the 1er RCP, trained in North Africa, kept the blue Air Army calot. All British parachutists wore an amaranth, or red, beret at the initiative of their leader, General Boy Browning.

Beginning in August 1944, French parachutists of the 2e RCP/SAS wore the amaranth beret rather than the black. The 2e RCP marched in Paris on 11 November with this headgear bearing the cap badge (beret insignia) of the SAS. During this time, the SAS parachutists of the 3e RCP and the shock troops kept the black beret.

In 1945, only the 2e RCP retained the right to wear the amaranth beret, extended to the SAS demi-brigade SAS (not at that time colonial) in 1946–1947.

On 7 April 1945, the two Parachute Chasseur regiments (770 men) parachuted into the Netherlands in (Operation Amherst).

=== Post-war ===
On 1 August 1945, the 3rd and 4th SAS regiments, became the French 2nd and 3rd Parachute Chasseur Regiments in a transfer to the French Army. They merged to form a single 2nd Parachute Chasseur regiment (2^{e} R.C.P), with a garrison at Tarbes. On 2 October 1945, British general Michael Calvert, commandant of the SAS Brigade, visited the regiments and bestowed on the men of the 2^{e} RCP their respective fanions and Napoleon chapeaus, and on the 3^{e} RCP the Wellington chapeau, a sign of friendship and fraternity in arms.

The 2nd Parachute Chasseur Regiment (2^{e} RCP) was dissolved on 30 September 1946. Another 2^{e} RCP, not related to the SAS, was trained and entrusted with the regimental colours and the amaranth beret. At dissolution, troops were spread across the 1st Parachute Chasseur Regiment and the 1st Shock Airborne Infantry Regiment (1^{er} R.I.C.A.P), while the regimental colours were entrusted to the SAS Parachute Commando demi-brigade of Indochina. This commando demi-brigade went through the colonial Troupes de marine and later became the 1st Marine Infantry Parachute Regiment, (1^{er} R.P.I.Ma), which kept the regimental colours, decorations and traditions of the 2nd Parachute Chasseur Regiment/SAS.

== Traditions ==
=== Motto ===
"Who dares wins" is the general motto of the SAS, translated in French to "Qui ose gagne".

=== Insignia ===
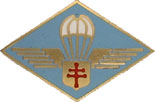
Para Chasseur Company of the Free French Forces (FFL).

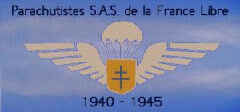
Free French Forces SAS, retained by the SAS paratroopers of Free France 1940–1945.

=== Battle honors ===
The regimental colors bear painted in golden letters the following inscriptions:

- Crete 1942
- Libya 1942
- Southern Tunisia 1943
- France 1944-1945
- Ardennes in Belgium 1945
- Holland 1945
- Indochina 1946-1954

=== Decorations ===
- Croix de la Légion d'Honneur
- Croix de Compagnon de la Libération
- Croix de guerre 1939-1945 with six palms
- Belgian Croix de Guerre
- Dutch Croix de Guerre
- Bronze Star Medal (U.S.)

Bears wearing :

- Fourragere bearing the colors of the Légion d'honneur (with olive 1939–45)
- Fourragère des T.O.E (Demi-brigade SAS Indochina)
- Fourragère de Compagnon de la Libération since 18 June 1996 (received by the 1^{er} R.P.I.Ma - the heir)

== Regimental Commanders ==
- Captain François Coulet: 1942 (1st Air Infantry Battalion, 1^{er} B.I.A)
- Capitaine Lambert : 1943 (1st Air Infantry Battalion, 1^{er} B.I.A)
- Chef de bataillon Pierre Fourcaud: July 1943 (1st Air Infantry Battalion, 1^{er} B.I.A)
- Commandant Pierre-Louis Bourgoin: November 1943 (4th Air Infantry Battalion, 4^{e} B.I.A)
- Commandant Pierre Puech-Samson: November 1944 (2^{e} R.C.P)
- Lieutenant-colonel Jacques Pâris de Bollardière: 1 August 1945 (2^{e} R.C.P)
- Colonel Reynier : 1945 (2^{e} R.C.P - non-SAS)

== Notable members of the 2nd Parachute Chasseur Regiment ==
- Lucien Neuwirth French député, known as "father of the Pill" for his proposed law on birth control enacted in 1967. Enlisted in the 4th air infantry battalion in 1943, he fought in Brittany then parachuted into Holland, where he miraculously escaped a firing squad.
- Jacques Bouffartigue, French painter
- Marcel Edme, Legion of Honour recipient who served as France's most senior military adviser to the Togolese Armed Forces.

== Sources and bibliography ==
- Collectif, Histoire des parachutistes français, Société de Production Littéraire, 1975.
- Qui ose gagne (France-Belgique 1943-1945, les parachutistes du 2^{e} RCP / 4th SAS Service historique de l'armée de terre, 1997, page 296, ISBN 978-2863231036
- Les Bérets Rouges, Amicale des Anciens Parachutistes S.A.S., 1952, page 329
- Pierre Dufour, Chasseurs Parachutistes 1935-2005, éditions Lavauzelle, 2005 - ISBN 2-7025-1287-9.
- Roger Flamand, Paras de la France libre, Éditions Presses de la Cité, 1976 - ISBN 978-2-258-00036-0.
- Olivier Porteau, L'Action combinée du 2e régiment de chasseurs parachutistes et de la Résistance bretonne dans le dispositif stratégique de l'opération Overlord, in Patrick Harismendy et Erwan Le Gall (dir.), Pour une histoire de la France Libre, Presses Universitaires de Rennes, 2012, p. 107-123
- David Portier, Les Parachutistes SAS de la France Libre 1940-1945, Éditions Nimrod, septembre 2010
- Esquisse d'un bilan réévalué de l'action des parachutistes français en Bretagne : mission militaire et/ou politique ? Revue d'histoire contemporaine en Bretagne, n°2, été 2013, article en ligne
- Serge Vaculik, Béret rouge - Scènes de la vie des commandos parachutistes S.A.S., Éditions Arthaud, 1952.
- Franck Segrétain, Opération Amherst, avril 1945 le raid des 2^{e} et 3^{e} RCP sur les pays bas. Revue Ligne de front n° 24, mai-juin 2010. ISSN 1953-0544
