= 3rd Parachute Chasseur Regiment =

- 3^{e} Régiment de Chasseurs Parachutistes
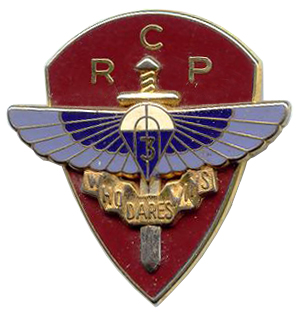
- Active: 1943–1945; 1979–1998
- Country: France
- Branch: French Army
- Type: Parachute Infantry
- Role: Infantry
- Garrison/HQ: Brigade SAS; 24^{e} DAP
- Motto: "Who Dares Wins" (French: Qui ose gagne)
- Engagements: Liberation of France; Liberation of The Netherlands

Insignia
- Abbreviation: 3^{e} R.C.P

The 3rd Parachute Chasseur Regiment (French: 3^{e} Régiment de Chasseurs Parachutistes) or 3^{e} RCP was a French unit of Second World War known in the British Army as the 3rd SAS Regiment and originally named the 3rd Air Infantry Battalion. Involved in the operations of the Liberation of France and The Netherlands, the unit was temporarily dissolved at the end of the conflict and was reorganized between 1979 and 1998.

== Designations ==
- 6 June 1943: creation of the 3rd Air Infantry Battalion (3^{e} R.C.P).
- 1 April 1944: the 3^{e} R.C.P. was designated as 3rd Parachute Chasseur Regiment.
- Summer of 1945: dissolution of 3^{e} R.C.P. Effectifs are integrated into the 2nd Parachute Chasseur Regiment (2^{e} R.C.P).
- 1979: unit recreated at the corps of the E.T.A.P.
- 1998: dissolution of the 3^{e} R.C.P.

== History ==
=== Successive garrisons ===
- Camberly
- Kilmarnock
- Camp d'Auchinlech
- Nantes

=== World War II ===
==== Formation ====
At the end of 1942, while the 1st Air Infantry Battalion was being formed in England at the corps of the Free French Air Forces, Captain Jean-Marie Bouvier and Captain Fournier assembled volunteers of the Free French Forces in Cairo, Egypt. The unit, which was created in Rouïba, Algeria, was transferred to the Tripolitania region in Libya and then to Mena Camp in Egypt before rejoining again in Rouïba in October with an effective force of almost 600 men.

Officially constituted on 6 June 1943, the 3rd Air Infantry Battalion joined Camp de Camberly in England on 7 November. The unit, reduced to just 300 men, was commanded by Captain Château-Jobert.

The 3rd Air Infantry Battalion and 1st Air Infantry Battalion, which was just redesignated as the 4th Air Infantry Battalion, were regrouped at the corps of a Demi-Brigade, commanded by Lieutenant-Colonel Durand, a veteran of the French Corps of Africa. Integrated into the British Forces, the two battalions were incorporated in the Special Air Service Brigade of Brigadier Mac Leod in December 1943. The 3rd and 4th BIA were designated respectively as 3rd and 4th French SAS Regiments at the corps of the Brigade and the men gained access to the various SAS centers of instruction.

The British parachute wings were obtained after eight jumps. The parachute wings insignia received by the newly reformed 3rd SAS Regiment was formulated by Captain Georges Bergé, made out of fabric and placed on the chest.

At the end of the month of January 1944, the Demi-Brigade was transferred to Scotland. On 1 April, the two units were designated as Parachute Chasseur Regiments (RCP). The 3rd and 4th BIA became the 3rd Parachute Chasseur Regiment (3^{e}RCP) and 2nd Parachute Chasseur Regiment (2^{e}RCP) respectively.

The mission of the SAS is that of commando nature. Contrary to the classical parachute troops, their mission was not to engage the enemy directly but to operate behind enemy lines in sabotage, clandestine, and harassment missions. With no main rear combat support, missions were led by small units, which engaged and withdrew from combat quickly, utilizing swift attacks.

The composition of a regiment SAS, which was similar in strength to a large infantry battalion, was in theory about 600 men. These were divided into one command company (squadron) composed of a section (troops) of transmission with a 12 team radio, one support section, one protection section and services, one motorized company with four platoons of 4 jeeps, and three combat companies each with a command section and two combat sections with four groups.

The encadrement rate of the unit was twice as superior as that of a regular battalion. Counting sixty to sixty-five officers and seventy warrant officers, almost a fifth of the total effective force were officers.

Each man was equipped with a Colt M1911, a U.S. dagger, a carbine with folding buttstock or a Sten submachine gun. The collective armament included Bren guns and anti-tank arms like the bazooka or PIAT.

==== Liberation of France ====
While the 2nd Parachute Chasseur Regiment was deployed in Brittany during the operations of disembarking in June 1944, the 3rd Parachute Chasseur Regiment was held temporarily in England. The 3rd Parachute Chasseur Regiment was entrusted with action covering the southern flank of the U.S. 3rd Army which had just disembarked in Normandy making way west across the country. Between 16 July and 7 October 1944, the regiment was dropped in France along the line Nantes-Lyon. The mission of the regiment was to contain an opposing force of almost 100,000 men making way to the north.

An initial detachment, at the orders of Captain Simon and constituted from a reinforced squadron, a Demi-Squadron from the 3rd squadron intervened in Poitou and Limousin from mid-July, made way on Châteauroux and Issoudun at the beginning of September, before regrouping at the beginning of October south of Saint-Nazaire.

The 2nd squadron of Captain Pierre Sicaud was first parachuted on Finistère in the night of 4 August (near of Plougastel-Daoulas, Landerneau et Morlaix). Their mission consisted of protecting bridges necessary to assure the progression of U.S. Armoured Units. The 2nd rejoined the 1st squadron and the command Demi-Squadron which remained deployed until 12 August around the cities of Lyon, Chalon-sur-Saône, Autun, and Saint-Étienne.

Following a regrouping in the region of Aÿ Dizy and at Épernay, the 3rd RCP paraded in Paris on 11 November 1944. The casualty report of the regiment was moderate: 39 killed or missing in action and 72 wounded in action. The regiment placed 6,416 opposing forces out of combat, as well as 20 opposing tanks, 11 trains and a number of vehicles.

==== Liberation of The Netherlands ====
The two French SAS regiments were then engaged in The Netherlands in Operation Amherst. The 696 SAS operators were parachuted on 19 different Landing Zones between Ommen and Groningen. They preceded the 2nd Canadian Corps while sowing confusion, preventing the opposition from establishing defensive lines and also preserving the status of bridges.

The operation was a success for the Canadians, but the losses for the SAS regiments were heavy and represented more than 20% of the troops engaged. Accordingly, the 3rd RCP endured the loss of 12 killed, 40 missing, and 20 wounded.

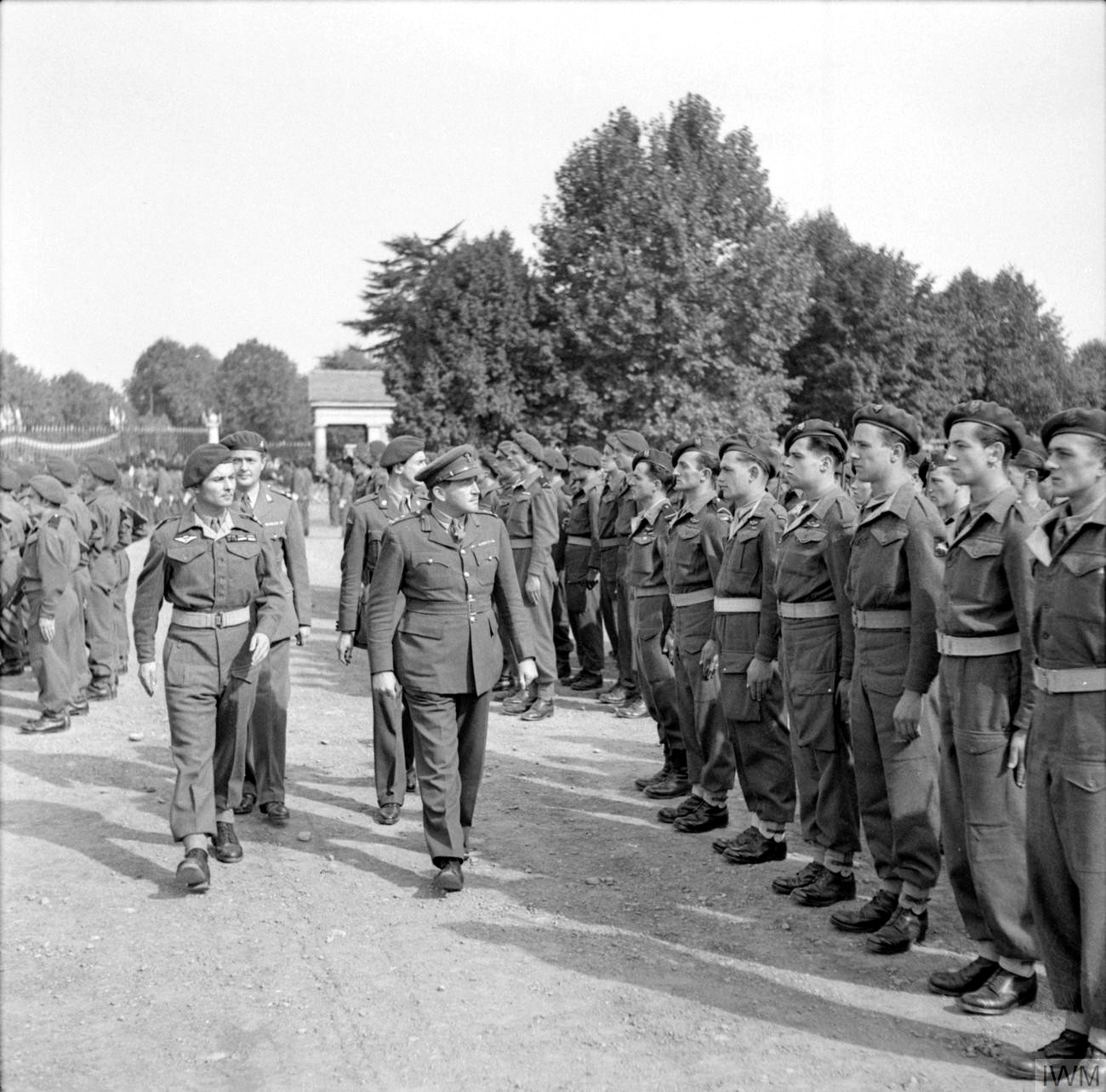
Brigadier Mike Calvert with members of 3 and 4 SAS (2 and 3 Regiment de Chasseurs Parachutistes) at Tarbes, southern France, 1945

In June 1945, at the end of the Second World War, the airborne troops left the Allied front lines. On 6 August, the three Parachute Chasseurs regiments and the 4^{e} RIA SAS, which had just been permanently reattached to the French Army, were incorporated into the newly created 24th Airborne Division.

Returned to their new reserve garrison with the induction of volunteers for the duration of the war, it was not possible to the maintain the entirety of the units. The 3rd Parachute Chasseur Regiment was then dissolved and absorbed by the 2nd Parachute Chasseur Regiment, with command entrusted to Lieutenant-Colonel de Bollardière.

On 2 October 1945, during an honorary ceremony in honor of the French SAS regiments of the 24th Airborne Division, Brigadier Calvert bestowed the Wellington Chapeau on the 3rd RCP and that of Napoleon on the 2nd RCP.

=== Post War ===
The 3rd RCP was recreated in 1979 at the corps of the airportable instruction center for which the regiment supplied support and logistics. Even though the regiment's principal mission revolved around ensuring the protection of the territory, the regiment also operated out of its principal area. In 1996, the regiment was briefly designated as "École des troupes aéroportées, the 3e Régiment de Chasseurs Parachutistes" (ETAP/3e RCP).

The unit was again dissolved in 1998 within the cadre of the reorganization of the armed forces.

The traditions of the 3rd RCP were readopted by the Center of Commando Instruction (CEC) of Givet in August 2006 (by dissolution of the 9th Zouave Regiment, a former unit of tradition of the CEC) until the dissolution of the latter in 2009.

== Traditions ==
=== Motto ===
"Who dares wins" is the general motto of the British SAS, translated in French to "Qui ose gagne".

=== Insignia ===
During the Second World War, the men of the 3rd RCP did not display any insignia which was specific to the unit. Incorporated into the British forces, the men of the regiment wore British uniforms and harbored the SAS insignia on their beret while carrying the parachute brevet of the Free French Forces on their chest. Sometimes, the SAS wings were used to reward their participation in war operations.

The specific insignia of the 3rd Parachute Chasseur Regiment wasn't created until the rebirth of the unit in 1979. The symbolic insignia of the regiment recalls largely the origin of the SAS of the Second World War.

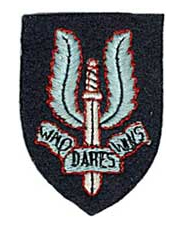
Beret Insignia of French SAS

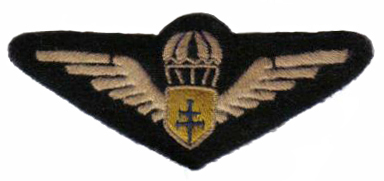
Parachute Brevet of the FFL
Brevet parachutiste FFL

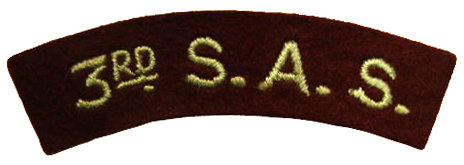
Arm patch of the 3^{e} RCP

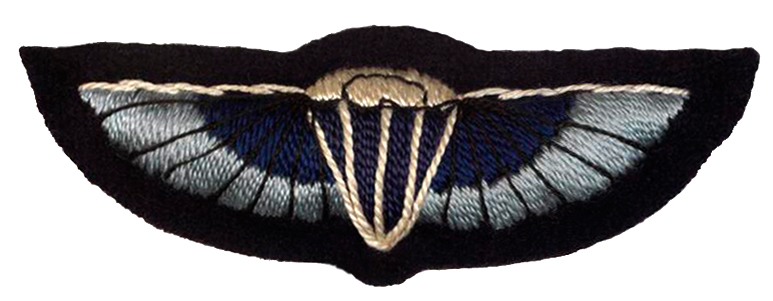
Operational SAS wings

=== Regimental Colours ===
The regimental colors of the French SAS was bestowed to the two Air Infantry Battalions by General Martial Valin of the Free French Air Forces. Entrusted to the Guard of the 4th Air Infantry Battalion 4th BIA, the regimental colours were then transferred to the 2nd Parachute Chasseur Regiment, then to the SAS Parachute Demi-Brigade of Indochina, the heir of the 1st Marine Infantry Parachute Regiment.

The shared SAS Regimental Colours is the most decorated of the Second World War. Colors of the regiment include:

- Knight of the Légion d'honneur
- Compagnon de la Libération
- Croix de guerre 1939-1945 with 7 palms avec sept palmes
- Croix de guerre Belge 1939-1945
- Bronze Star (U.S.)
- Medal of the Order of the Netherlands Lion, as well as:
  - Fourragere with colors bearing the Légion d'Honneur with olive 39-45
  - Fourragere T.O.E
  - Fourragere of the Compagnon de la Libération since 18 June 1996

=== Honors ===
The regimental colors bear the following 7 inscriptions obtained for 7 citations at the orders of the armed forces:

- Crete 1942
- Libya 1942
- South Tunisia 1943
- France 1944
- Ardennes 1945
- Holland 1945
- Indochina 1946-1954

To differentiate the unit, Château Jobert fabricated specific fanion in 1944 and 1945. The 3rd Parachute Chasseur Regiment nevertheless received the respective Regimental Colors only until February 15, 1982. Inscribed on the regimental colors of the 3rd RCP were:

- France 1944
- Holland 1945

Regimental colors of the 3rd RCP are decorated with the Croix de guerre 1939-1945 with 2 palms and bears wearing the Fourragere with colors of the Croix de guerre 1914-1918 with olive 1939-1945.

=== Decorations ===
The 3rd RCP obtained two citations at the orders of the Armed Air Force for action during the Second World War and accordingly obtained two citations of the croix de guerre with palm. The first citation was bestowed for combat between 16 July and 7 October 1944. The second citation was bestowed for actions in The Netherlands during April 1945 while leading in front of Canadian troops. This last citation was accompanied with the right to bear the fourragere with colors of the croix de guerre. The unit also obtained on 9 May 1950, for the same operation, the Royal Dutch Bronze Lion.

== Notable Members ==
=== Commanders ===
- 1943–1943: Commandant Jean-Marie Bouvier
- 1943–1944: Commandant Pierre Chateau-Jobert
- 1944–1945: Lieutenant-Colonel Jacques Pâris de Bollardière
- 1979–1981: Colonel Baulain
- 1981–1983: Colonel Chiama
- 1983–1985: Colonel Menage
- 1985–1987: Colonel Coiffet
- 1987–1989: Colonel Charrier
- 1989–1990: Colonel de Badts de Cugnac
- 1991–1994: Colonel Chanteclair
- 1994–1996: Colonel Bourgain
- 1996–1998: Colonel Menard
- 1998–1998: Lieutenant-Colonel Rideau

=== Other Personnel ===
- Jean-Marie Bouvier (1896–1964)
- Pierre Chateau-Jobert (1912–2005).
- Jacques Pâris de Bollardière
- Edgard Tupët-Thomé, Lieutenant-Commandant in charge of 2nd company, 3rd Air Infantry Battalion

== See also ==
- 2nd Parachute Chasseur Regiment
