= Marcel Edme =

French soldier (1924–1979)

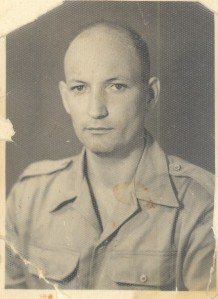
- Marcel Edme
- Born: 17 August 1924; Madagascar
- Died: December 18, 1979 (aged 55); Togo
- Occupation: Military officer

Colonel Marcel Edme (17 August 1924 – 18 December 1979) was a French military officer, paratrooper, and Legion of Honour recipient who served as France's most senior military adviser to the Togolese Armed Forces until his death in a helicopter crash in 1979. Born in Madagascar in 1924, Edme served in World War II as a member of the 2nd Parachute Chasseur Regiment, parachuting into occupied France twice, and later took part in the fighting in the Battle of Dien Bien Phu in 1954 with the 1st Colonial Parachute Battalion where he was taken prisoner. He went on to fight in Algeria.

In the 1970s, he was assigned as France's military attaché to Benin.

In 1979, while serving as de facto chief of staff of the Togolese Armed Forces and senior military adviser to President Gnassingbé Eyadéma, he and two other French military officers as well as two Togolese pilots were killed when the helicopter they were riding in crashed in poor weather.
