= Plumelec =

Plumelec Breton: Pluveleg
- Commune
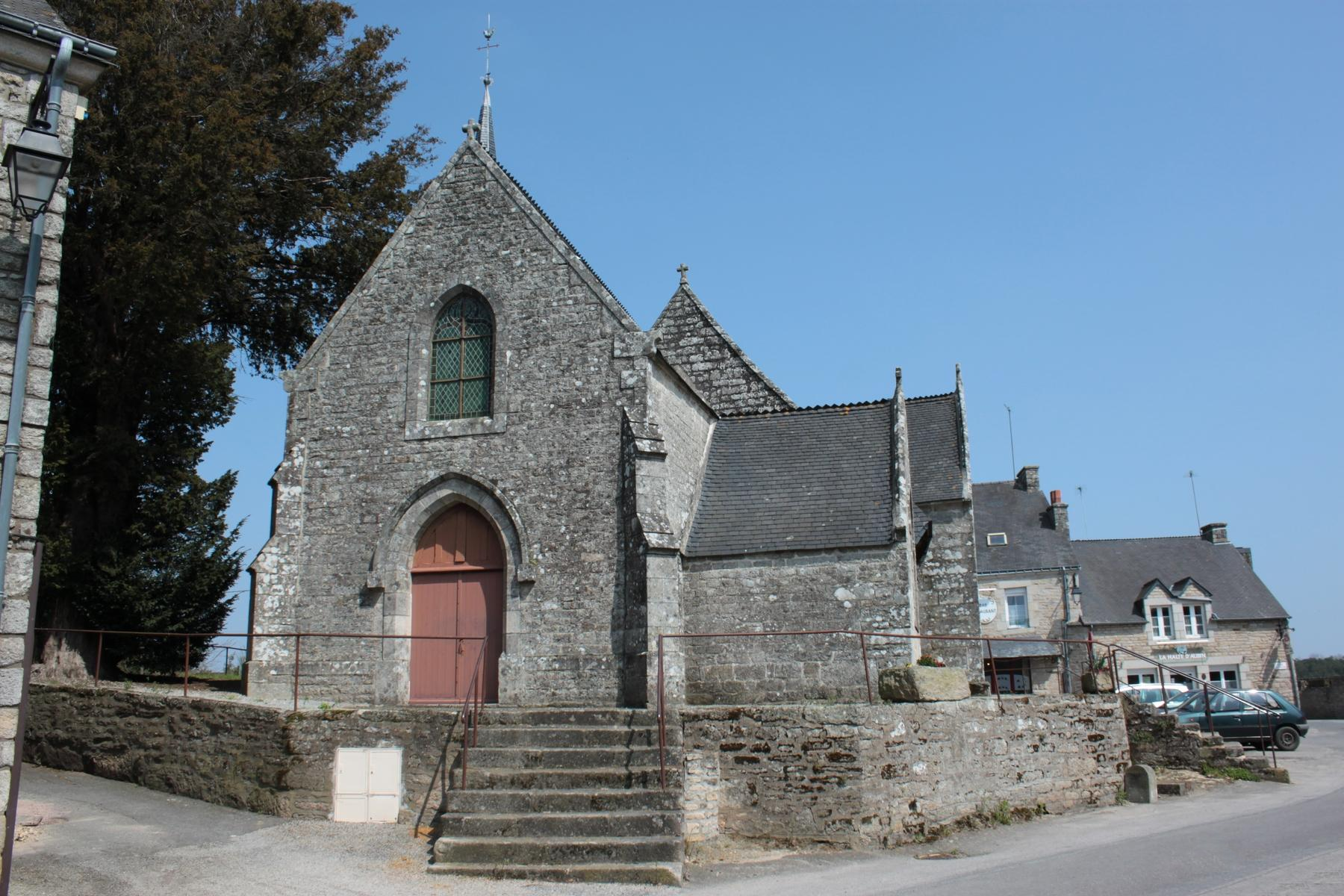
- The Church of Saint-Maurice in Plumelec

- Coat of arms
- Location of Plumelec
- Location within France Location within Brittany
- Coordinates: 47°50′19″N 2°38′22″W
- Country: France
- Region: Brittany
- Department: Morbihan
- Arrondissement: Pontivy
- Canton: Moréac
- Intercommunality: Centre Morbihan Communauté

Government
  - Mayor (2026–32): Stéphane Hamon
- Area^{1}: 58.36 km^{2} (22.53 sq mi)
- Highest elevation: 165 m (541 ft)
- Lowest elevation: 27 m (89 ft)
- Population (2023): 2,754
  - Density: 47.19/km^{2} (122.2/sq mi)
- Time zone: UTC+01:00 (CET)
  - Summer (DST): UTC+02:00 (CEST)
- INSEE/Postal code: 56172 /56420
- ^{1} French Land Register data, which excludes lakes, ponds, glaciers > 1 km^{2} (0.386 sq mi or 247 acres) and river estuaries.

Plumelec (French pronunciation: [plymlɛk], Breton: Pluveleg) is a commune in the Morbihan department of the Brittany region, in north-western France.

== Geography ==
Plumelec is 95 kilometres (59 mi) west of Rennes via the RN24 road, and 132 kilometres (82 mi) north-west of Nantes via the RN165 road. The commune is situated on the Brittany peninsula and is approximately 10 kilometres (6.2 mi) from the southern coast.

== Toponymy ==
The Plumelec placename is composed of plou (parish) and Melec, patron of Plumelec (possibly Mellitus or Mellit via worship imported from the British Isles). The name of its people is Méléciens.

== History ==
During World War II, on the night of 5–6 June 1944, the SAS team captain Pierre Marienne (9 Free French), responsible for the preparation of Operation Dingson, was accidentally parachuted near Plumelec, 800 metres (2,600 ft) from the la Grée Mill, where there was a German observation post. During the skirmish that ensued, corporal Émile Bouétard was killed: He was the first death of Operation Overlord.

On 12 July 1944 at dawn, 18 resistance fighters were murdered by French collaborators at Kerihuel: Seven paratroopers, eight rebels and three farmers (including Messrs. Alexandre and Rémi Gicquello, father and son, 46 and 18 years old, and Mr. Ferdinand-Mathurin Danet, 49 years). Captain Pierre Marienne, nicknamed the "lion" of Saint Marcel after the battle of 18 June, was one of the victims. Three weeks later, on Sunday 6 August, was the Liberation, American tanks travelled through in the direction of Vannes and Lorient.

In all, there were 42 men from Plumelec and one woman (Ms. Armande Morizur, 35 years), engaged in the Resistance, who gave their lives for the Liberation.

The last survivors of the massacre of Kerihuel have since died: Angèle Guillaume (née Gicquello) died on 2 November 2011, at the age of 81; Roger Danet, son of Ferdinand-Mathurin, died in January 2013; and his brother Augustin Danet, aged 8 years old at the time of the event, died in February 2014.

== Politics and administration ==
=== List of mayors ===
List of mayors of Plumelec
Start	End	Name	Party	Other details
March 2001	March 2014	Léon Guyot	DVD	Butcher
March 2014	In progress	Stéphane Hamon	DVG	Owner of a bar-restaurant in the commune

== Population and society ==
The inhabitants of Plumelec are called in French Méléciens.

=== Demography ===
Historical population

Year	Pop.	±% p.a.
1793	2,551	—
1800	2,513	−0.21%
1806	2,503	−0.07%
1821	2,507	+0.01%
1831	2,627	+0.47%
1836	2,663	+0.27%
1841	2,732	+0.51%
1846	3,092	+2.51%
1851	3,070	−0.14%
1856	2,988	−0.54%
1861	3,082	+0.62%
1866	3,184	+0.65%

Year	Pop.	±% p.a.
1872	3,060	−0.66%
1876	3,101	+0.33%
1881	2,992	−0.71%
1886	3,068	+0.50%
1891	3,130	+0.40%
1896	3,043	−0.56%
1901	3,048	+0.03%
1906	2,998	−0.33%
1911	2,988	−0.07%
1921	2,787	−0.69%
1926	2,758	−0.21%
1931	2,732	−0.19%

Year	Pop.	±% p.a.
1936	3,004	+1.92%
1946	2,953	−0.17%
1954	2,733	−0.96%
1962	2,529	−0.97%
1968	2,498	−0.21%
1975	2,410	−0.51%
1982	2,355	−0.33%
1990	2,337	−0.10%
2007	2,542	+0.50%
2012	2,732	+1.45%
2017	2,680	−0.38%
2023	2,754	+0.45%

From 1962 to 1999: Population without double counting; for the years following: municipal population.
Source: Ldh/EHESS/Cassini until 1999 and INSEE (1968–2023)

== Sport ==
=== Cycling ===
Many cycling races pass through or arrive by the Côte de Cadoudal, which presents a mean slope of 6.2% at Plumelec and a vertical ascent of 43–154 metres (141–505 ft) over 1.8 kilometres (1.1 mi). This is why the most prestigious cycling races, such as the Tour de France and the French National Road Race Championships, retain Plumelec as a place of passage and arrival.

The commune is also the mainstay of the Grand Prix de Plumelec-Morbihan, a one-day race held since 1974. This is an event which counts towards the French Road Cycling Cup, it has been classified as 1.1 in the UCI Europe Tour since 2005.

==== Tour de France ====
- 1982 – Stage 9 (69 kilometres (43 mi) TTT) on 12 July, Lorient-Plumelec, won by team TI–Raleigh(Netherlands)
- 1985 – Prologue (6.8 kilometres (4.2 mi) ITT) on 28 June, Plumelec-Plumelec, won by Bernard Hinault (France)
- 1997 – Stage 3 on 8 July, Vire-Plumelec, won by Erik Zabel (Germany)
- 2008 – Stage 1 on 5 July, Brest-Plumelec, won by Alejandro Valverde (Spain)
- 2015 – Stage 9 on 12 July, Vannes-Plumelec

==== French Road Championship ====
- 1973 – won by Bernard Thévenet
- 1979 – won by Roland Berland
- 2003 – won by Didier Rous

==== French Road Cycling Cup ====
- 2008 – 31 May, Grand Prix de Plumelec, won by Thomas Voeckler (France)

=== Football ===
- La Mélécienne de Plumelec (and Coeur de Lanvaux) can be found in the District 2 championship

=== Basketball ===
- Plumelec Basket Club

== Local culture and heritage ==
=== Places and monuments ===
The commune contains eight monuments listed in the inventory of historical monuments and two places listed in the general inventory of cultural heritage.

==== Chateaus and manors ====
The town has several chateaus and manors:

- The Château de Callac of the 17th century, situated in the Callac locality:
  - The facades and roofs of the main building, known as "aile des tours" [wing of the towers], as well as the grand lounge of the first floor with its painted ceiling have been classified since 10 March 1971. The facades and roofs of buildings surrounding the courtyard, including the common and the entrance gate, have been registered since 10 March 1971.
  - The pleasure garden of the chateau, completed in 1886, is listed in the general inventory of cultural heritage.
- The Manor de La Saudraie, of the 16th century, situated at a place called La Saudraie, has been registered since 25 September 1928.
- The Manor of Kerangat, 15th century: The pleasure garden of the domain, realised in 1886, is listed in the general inventory of cultural heritage.
- The Manor of Cadoudal, 17th century, has been registered since 29 March 1935. The manor is surrounded by a wall with battlements and without moat. It bears the name of Georges Cadoudal, leader of the Chouannerie who was born 1 January 1771.
- The Manor of Penclen.

==== Churches ====
On the territory of the commune, there are three churches:

- The Saint Maurice Church, located in the hamlet of Saint-Aubin, dating to 1513, has been registered since 9 June 1925. This church is interesting for the decorated pits of the rectangular choir, and the size of it, larger than the rest of the church. This church contains a stained glass window representing the Trinity, dated from the 16th century and classified since 8 May 1978.
- The Church of the Sacred Heart of the 19th century.
- The Church of our Lady of the 19th century. This church contains a chalice in silver, dated to the 17th century and classified since 1 July 1959.

Of the ancient Church of Saint-Martin, built in the 15th century and demolished in 1890, the municipality maintains a statue representing the Virgin with the child, wooden painted and dated from the 17th century. This statue is filed since 25 March 1924.

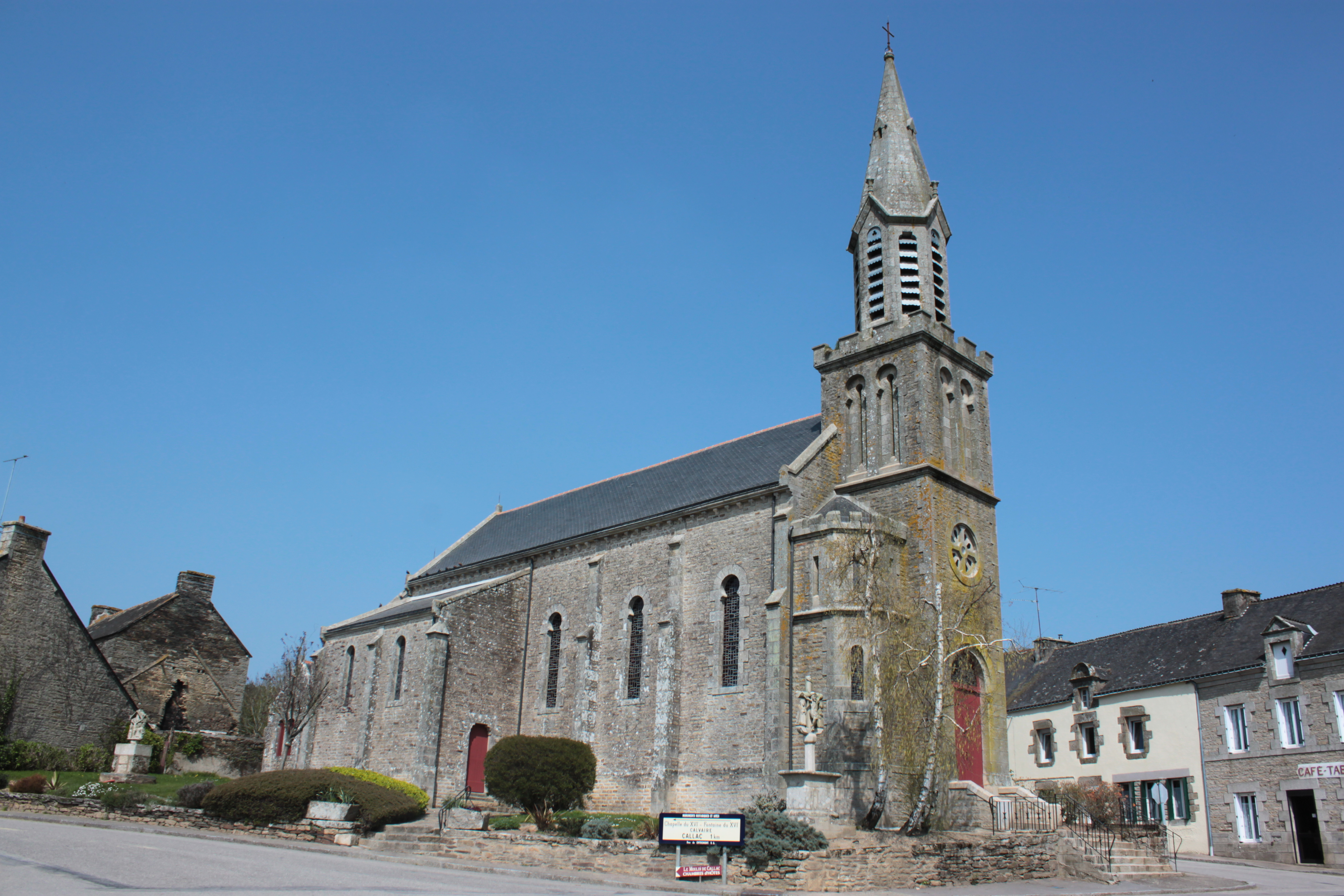
The Church of Our Lady

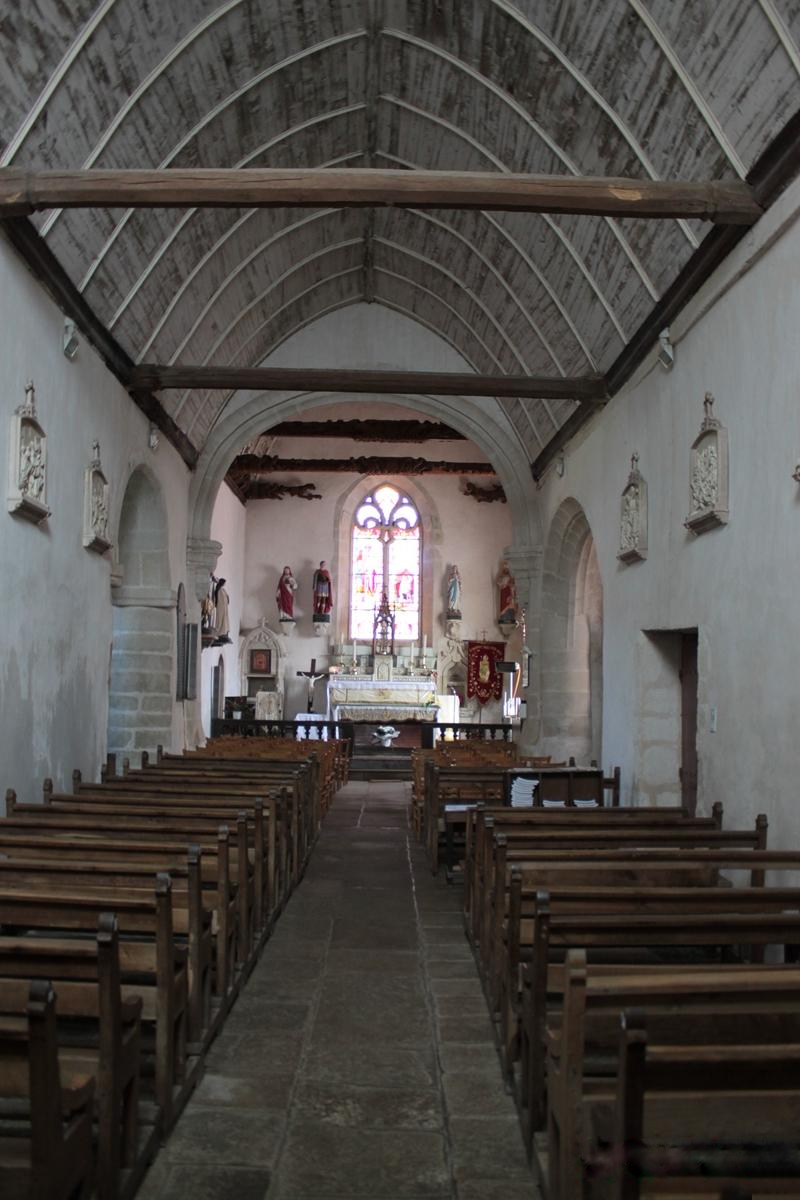
The Church of Saint-Maurice

==== Chapels, crosses and calvaries ====
On the territory of the commune, the Chapel of Saint-Maudé was built in the 15th century, the Chapel of Tolcoetmeur in the 17th century, the Chapel of Notre-Dame-de-Lorette in the 17th century, the Chapels of Callac and Saint-Joseph in the 19th century; as well as several crosses and calvaries:

- The Calvary of Callac, of the 17th century, located at the central crossroads of the village, is registered since 29 March 1935. This cross is carved, one side Christ with Saint John and the Virgin Mary placed on fins, and the other side the Pietà.
- The Merhan Cross of the 17th century, located in the hamlet of Callac registered since 29 March 1935. This cross which was located in a field of the commune was moved and installed facing the church as that of the village. The cross is carved in its upper part, one on the side of Christ and on the other the Pietà.
- The Cross of the Cemetery of Saint-Aubin of the 16th century, located in the hamlet of Saint-Aubin, registered since 25 September 1928. This cross which was located in a field of the commune and was moved and installed facing the church as that of the village. The cross is gable carved, one side Christ and the other the Virgin with the crowned child.
- The Way of the Cross of Callac, 1943.
Chapels and religious monuments in Plumelec

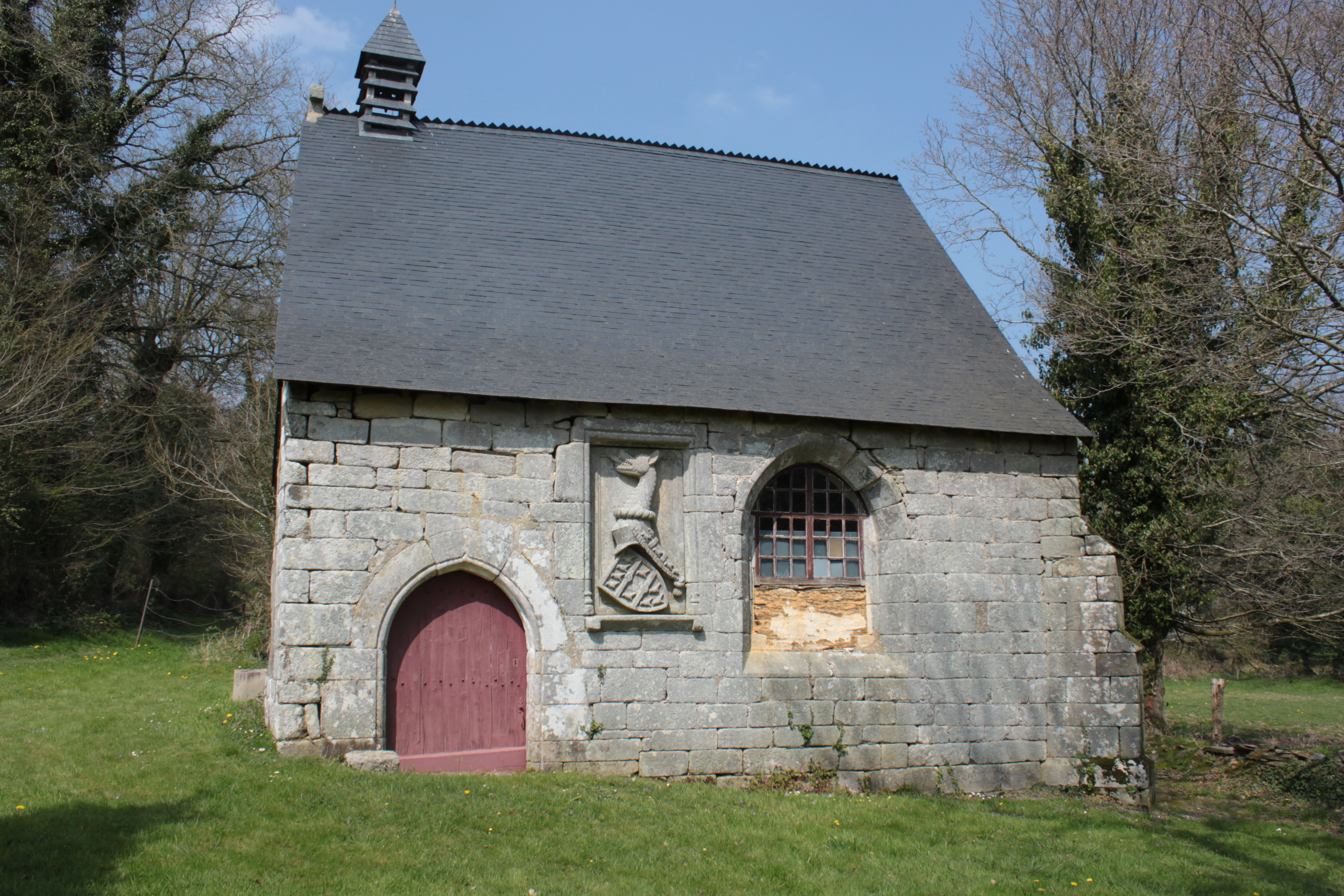
Chapel of Saint-Maudé

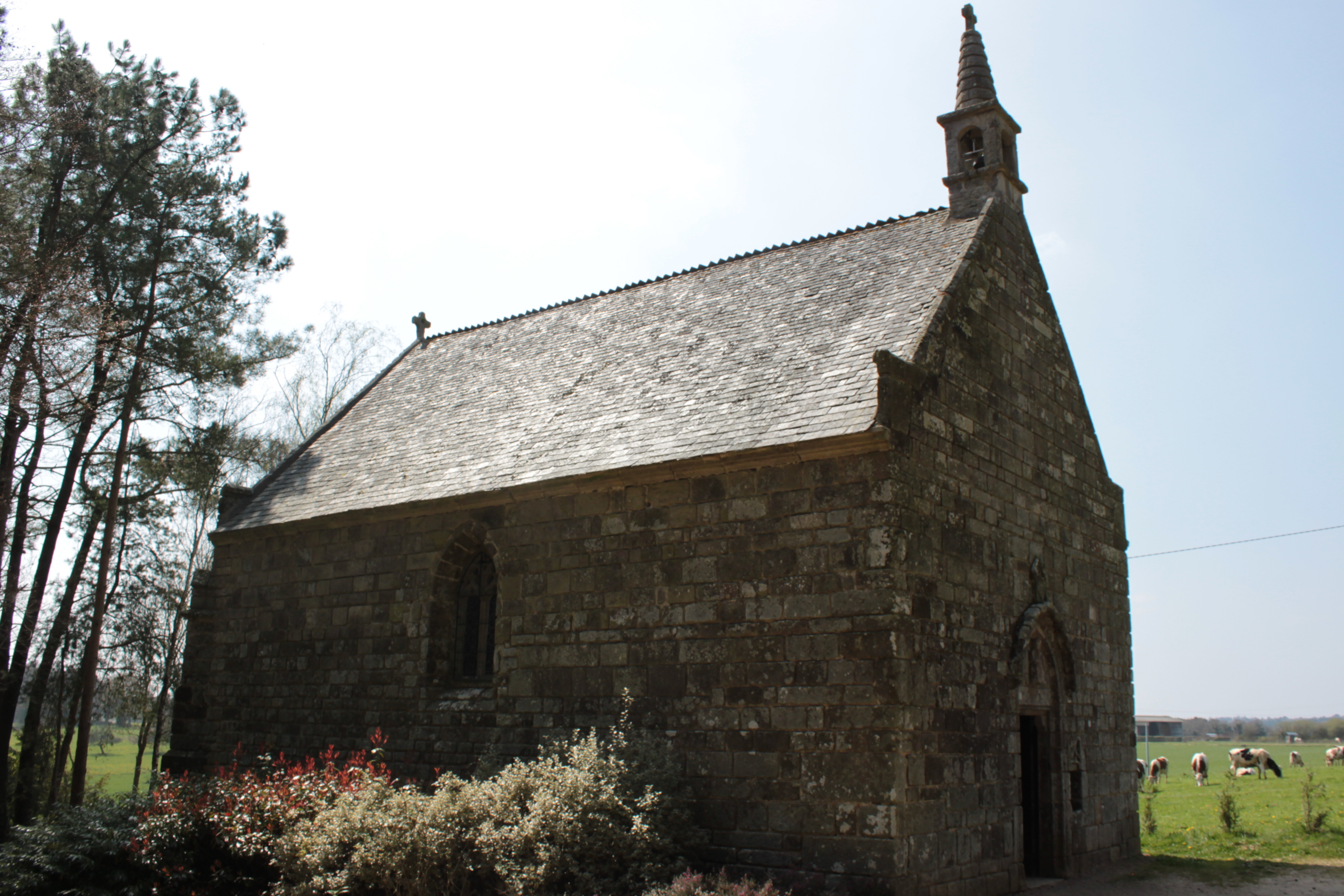
Chapel of Saint-Joseph

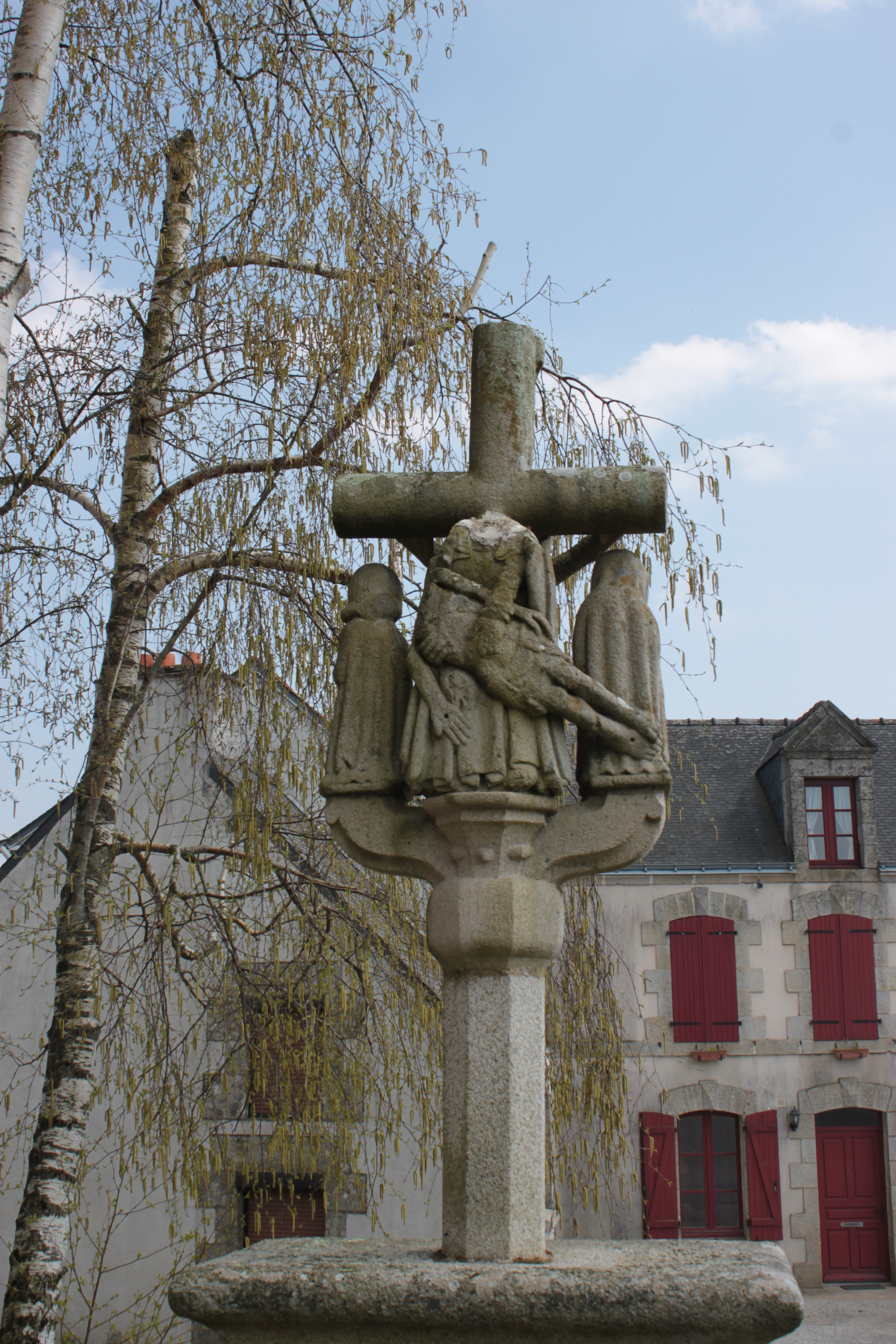
Cross of the village of Callac

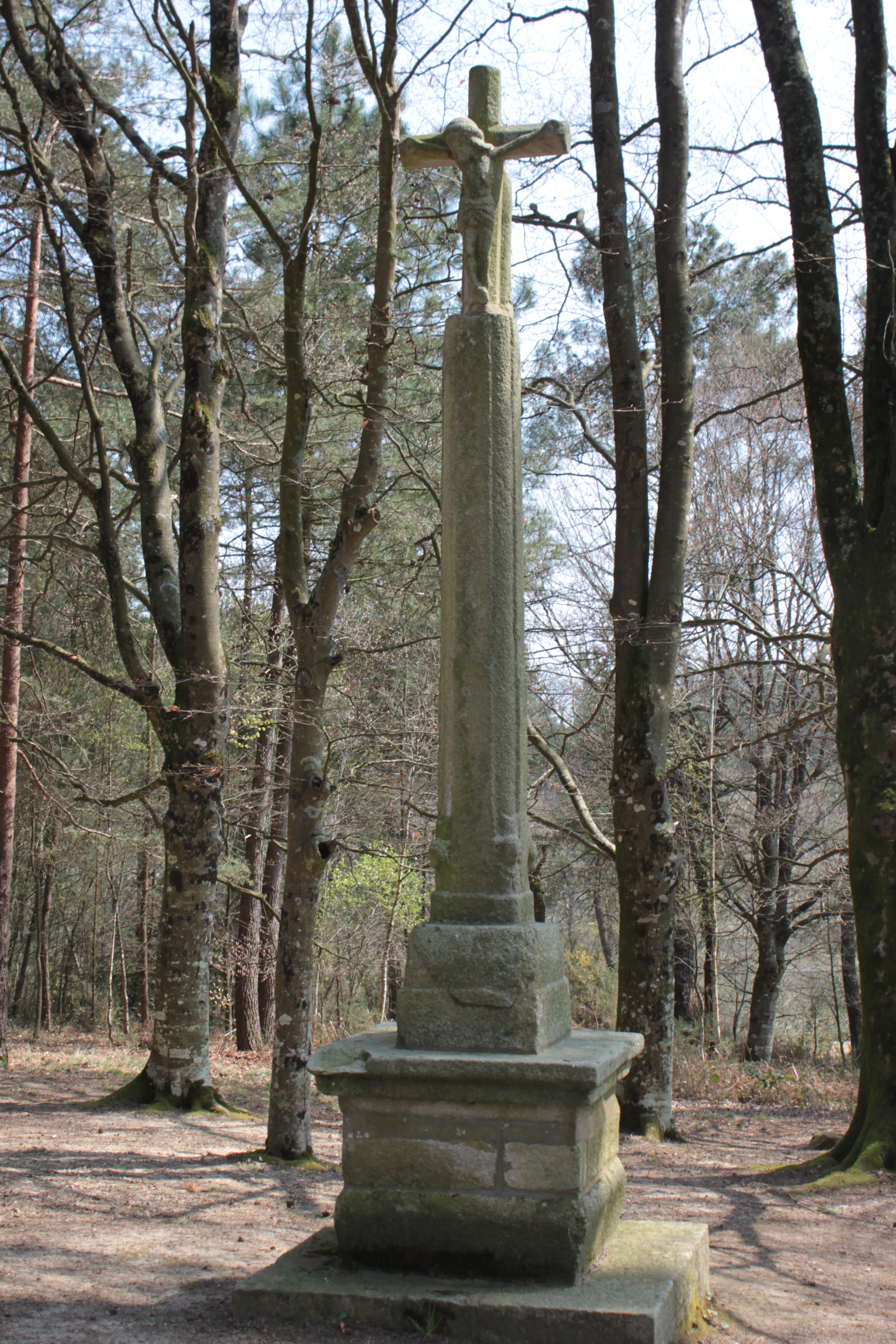
Calvary of Saint-Joseph, 1822

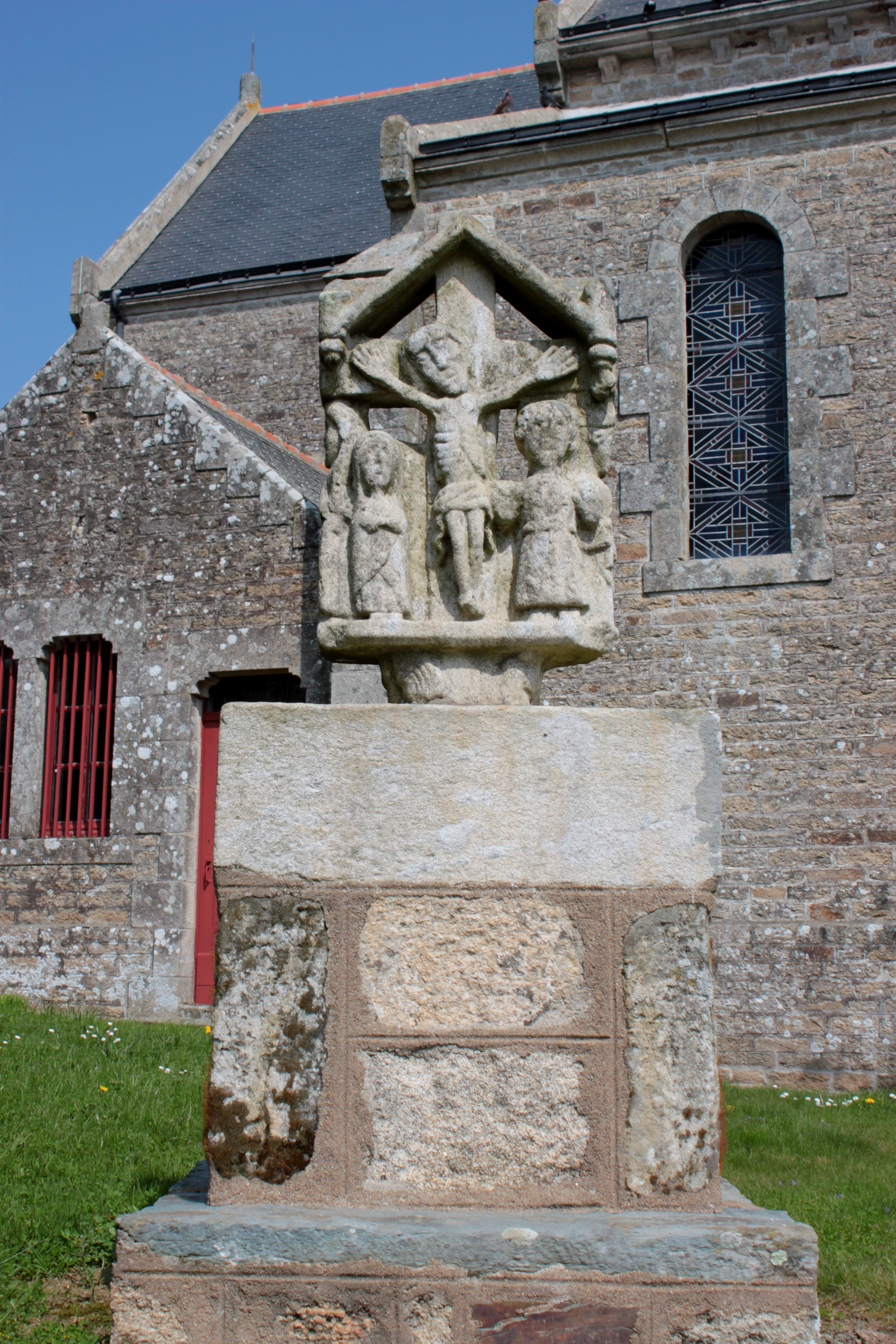
Croix Merhan, southern side

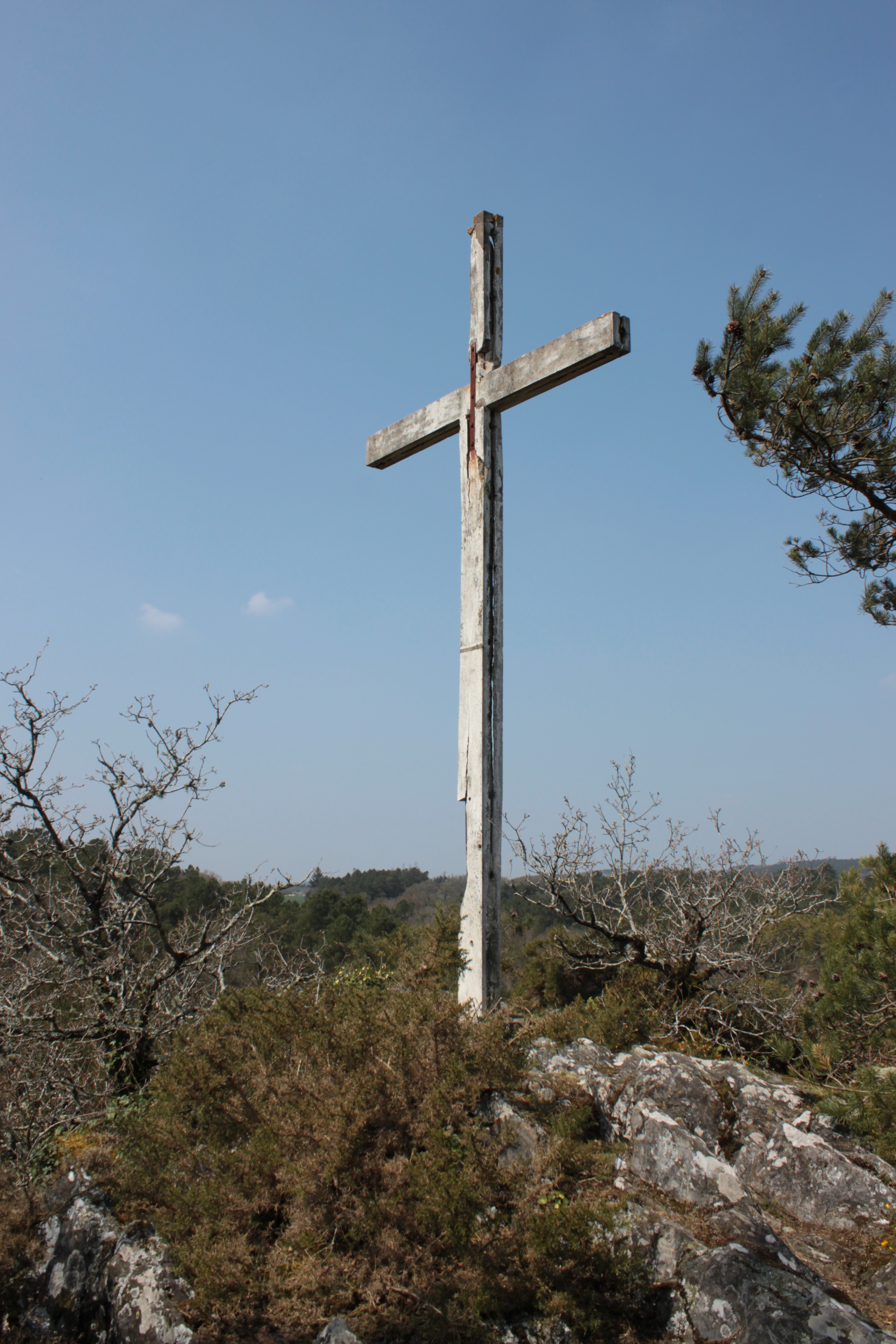
Grande Croix, Saint-Joseph.

==== Other monuments ====
The well of Touche-Berthelot of the 16th century, located at the way of the cross of Callac has been registered since 14 October 1963. The edge of this has the shape of an octagon with all the prominent angles cornered by pilasters. Four square tiles, placed diagonally to the coping, bear sculptures in high relief with heraldic subjects. They are topped with two crossed arches of wrought iron on which hangs the pulley.

The fountains of Saint-Aubin and Saint-Melec are also present, as are the monument of Kerihuel (12 July 1944 Massacre) and the Cave of Callac (1948, Saint-Joseph).

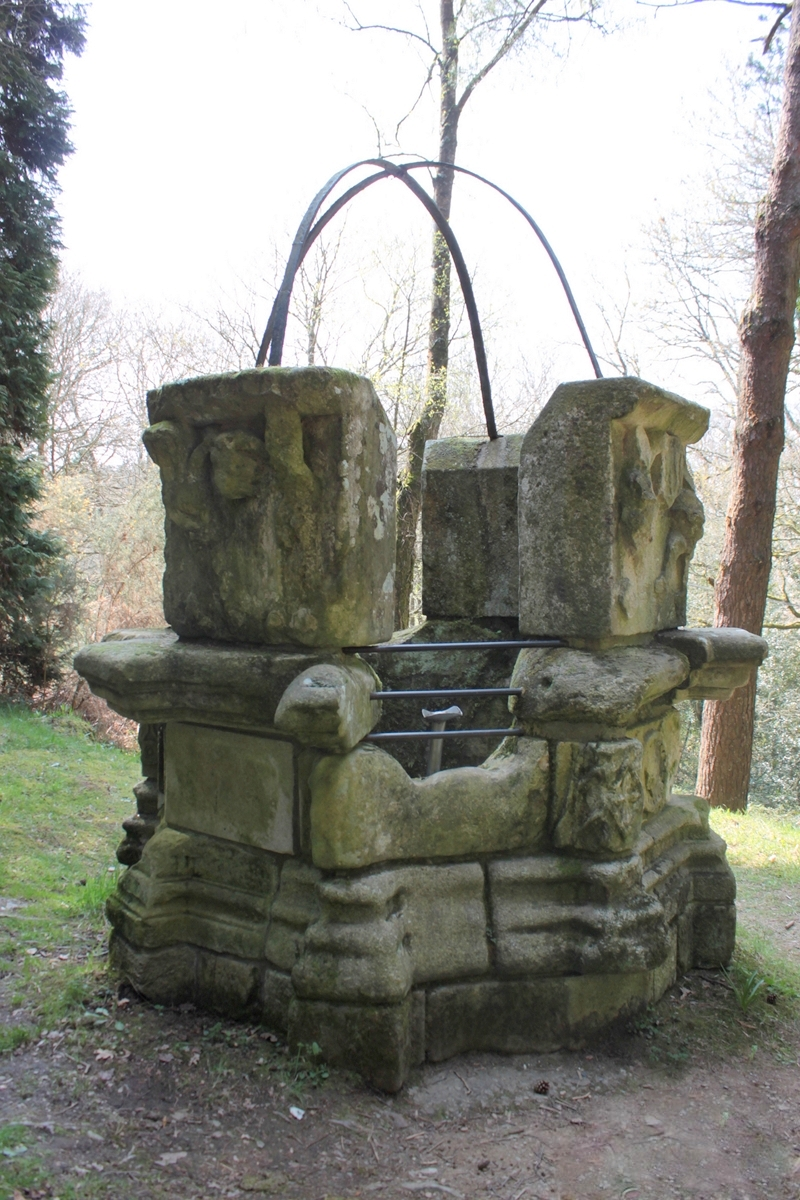
Puits de la Touche-Berthelot well, 16th century

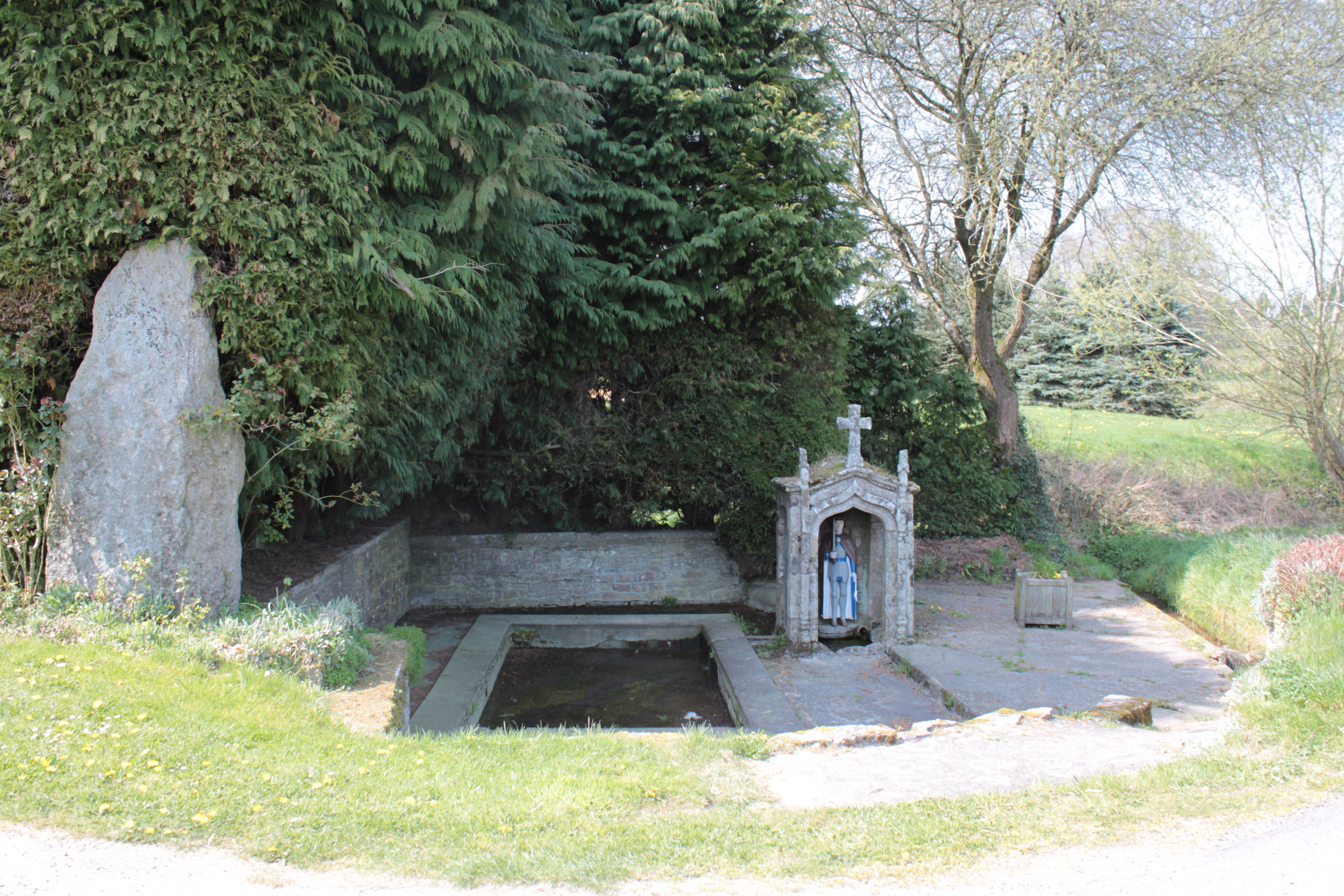
Fountain of Saint-Maurice, Saint-Aubin

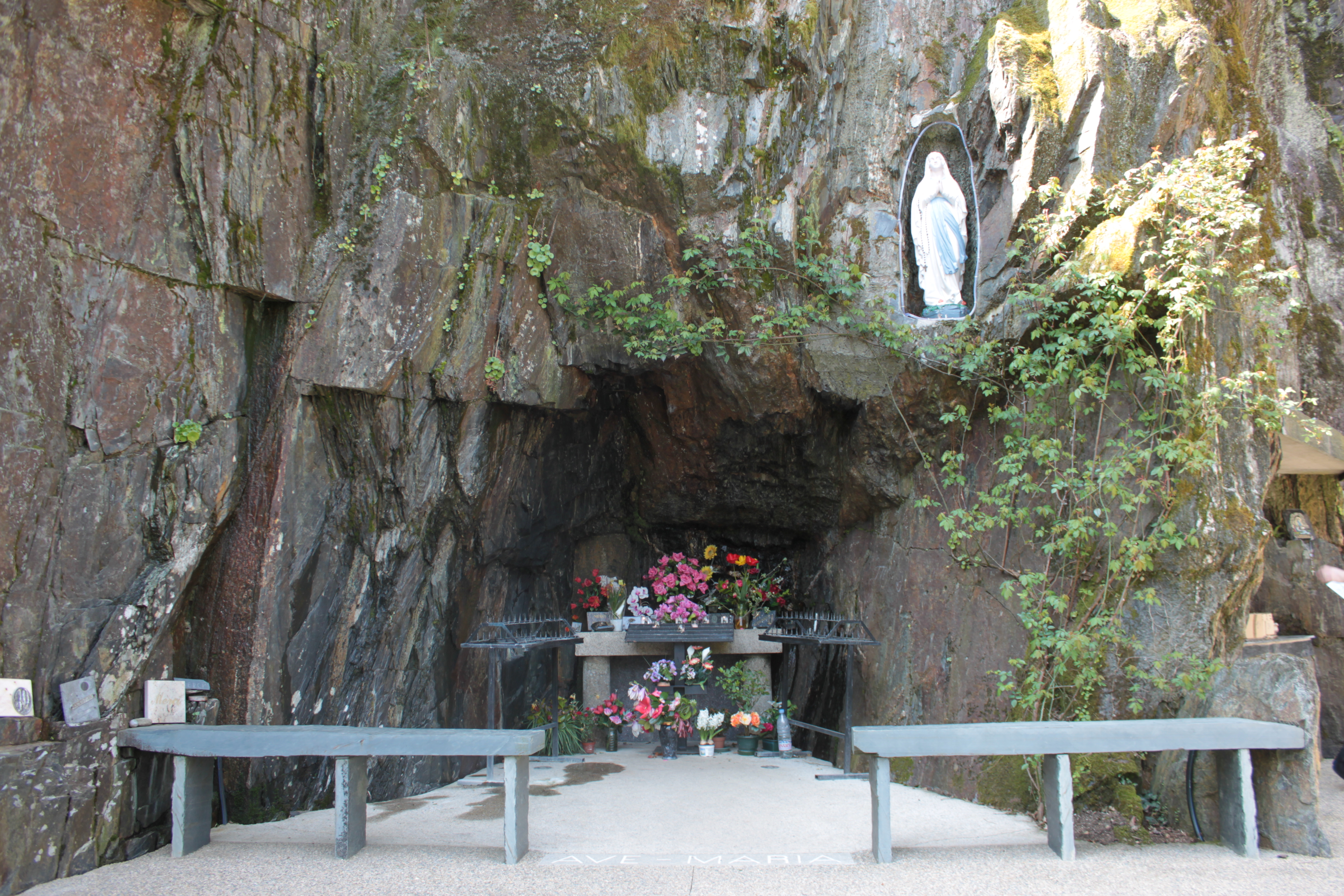
Grotte de Callac (Cave of Callac), 1948

=== Language ===
The commune was Breton-speaking until the 1850s (according to the dictionary of Ogée). Today, people mainly speak French and Gallo. In 1806, according to the survey conducted by Charles Coquebert de Montbret, the commune was also noted as Breton-speaking.

=== Notable people ===
- Frédéric Sammaritano, football player for AC Ajaccio in Ligue 1.
- Émile Bouétard, Corporal in the SAS paratroopers, first death of the Normandy landing.
- Pierre-Louis Bourgoin (1907–1970), known as le manchot [the penguin] during WWII: Commander in the 4th Parachute Battalion with the SAS when he parachuted into Brittany, then member of Parliament for Paris, was buried in the cemetery.
- Colline Hill, singer-songwriter of Indie folk. Played in Brittany at the Festival Interceltique de Lorient (2013), Tonnerres de Brest (2012) and the Vieilles Charrues Festival (Scène Kerouac with The Celtic Social Club, 2014).

=== Heraldry ===
Arms of Plumelec	The arms of Plumelec are blazoned: "Or to a staff of argent between two pales of azure each demi-potence chief, the first Dexter, the second Sinister, and darted on their sides spikes in courtesy, eight on each pale and two on each demi-potence, demi-potence Dexter charged of three argent rows in fess ermine tips and the sinister charged three suckers (fish) of argent laid in fess on the other." Motto: "vive valeque".

== See also ==
- Communes of the Morbihan department
