= Military ranks of Togo =

The Military ranks of Togo are the military insignia used by the Togolese Armed Forces. Being a former colony of France, Togo shares a rank structure similar to that of France.

== Commissioned officer ranks ==
The rank insignia of commissioned officers.

Rank group	General / flag officers		Senior officers				Junior officers
Togolese Army
Togolese Army	Général de division	Général de brigade	Colonel		Lieutenant-colonel	Commandant	Capitaine	Lieutenant	Sous-lieutenant
Togolese Navy
Togolese Navy	Vice-amiral	Contre-amiral	Capitaine de vaisseau		Capitaine de frégate	Capitaine de corvette	Lieutenant de vaisseau	Enseigne de vaisseau de 1^{re} classe	Enseigne de vaisseau de 2^{e} classe
(Togo) Togolese Air Force
(Togo) Togolese Air Force	Général de division aérienne	Général de brigade aérienne	Colonel-major	Colonel	Lieutenant-colonel	Commandant	Capitaine	Lieutenant	Sous-lieutenant
Rank group	General / flag officers		Senior officers				Junior officers

== Other ranks ==
The rank insignia of non-commissioned officers and enlisted personnel.

Rank group	Senior NCOs					Junior NCOs		Enlisted
Togolese Army									No insignia
Togolese Army	Major	Adjudant-chef	Adjudant	Sergent-chef	Sergent	Caporal-chef	Caporal	Soldat de 1^{ère} classe	Soldat de 2^{ème} classe
Togolese Navy									No insignia
Togolese Navy	Major	Maître principal	Premier-maître	Maître	Second-maître	Quartier-maitre de 1^{ère} classe	Quartier-maitre de 2^{ème} classe	Matelot de 1^{ère} classe	Matelot de 2^{ème} classe
(Togo) Togolese Air Force									No insignia
(Togo) Togolese Air Force	Major	Adjudant-chef	Adjudant	Sergent-chef	Sergent	Caporal-chef	Caporal	Soldat de 1^{ère} classe	Soldat de 2^{ème} classe
Rank group	Senior NCOs					Junior NCOs		Enlisted
