= Law enforcement in Togo =

Responsibility for law enforcement in Togo is primarily shared by the Police Nationale, the civilian national police, and the paramilitary Gendarmerie nationale togolaise.

== Police ==
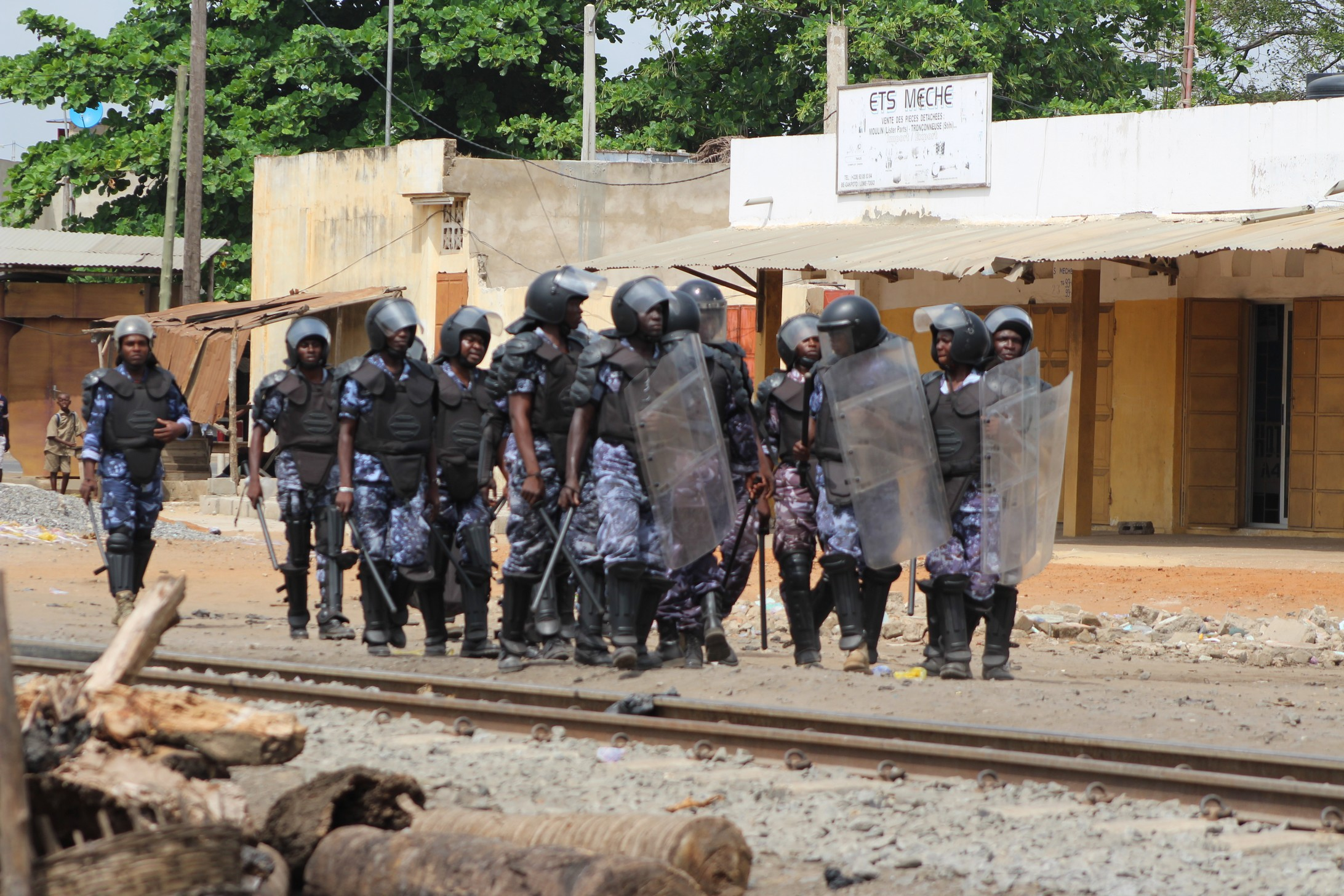
Police officers in Lomé during the 2017 Togolese protests

The Direction de la Police Nationale is commanded by a Director-General, who answers to the Minister of Security and Civil Defence. The force numbers about 4,000 male and female members, serving throughout the country.

Its main responsibilities are law enforcement, protection of people and property, prevention of delinquency and maintenance of public order.

== Gendarmerie ==
The Gendarmerie Nationale Togolaise is the national paramilitary police force of Togo.

== Sources ==
- World Police Encyclopedia, ed. by Dilip K. Das & Michael Palmiotto. by Taylor & Francis. 2004,
- World Encyclopedia of Police Forces and Correctional Systems, 2nd. edition, Gale., 2006
- Sullivan, Larry E. et al. Encyclopedia of Law Enforcement. Thousand Oaks: Sage Publications, 2005.
- "Nouveaux grades et appellations dans la Police Nationale à partir du 1er janvier". republiquetogolaise.com (in French). Government of Togo. 28 December 2020.
