= Chapeau =

French clerical hat

A chapeau is a flat-topped hat that is traditionally worn by senior clerics and certain nobles. Such hats are worn as part of an official costume or uniform.

== In heraldry ==
Coat of arms of Cardinal Lorenzo Antonetti, with a galero at the top

In European ecclesiastical heraldry, it is used as a mark of ecclesiastical dignity, especially that of cardinals, where it is called the red chapeau. It is worn over the shield by way of crest, as mitres and coronets are. A galero chapeau is flat, very narrow atop, but with a broad brim, adorned with long silken strings interlaced; suspended from within with rows of tassels, called by the Italians fiocchi, increasing in number as they come lower. The hat was given to them by Innocent IV in 1250, but was not used in arms till the year 1300. Until that time, the cardinals were represented with mitres. Archbishops and patriarchs bore a green hat, with four rows of tassels; bishops wore the same color, but with three; abbots and apostolical prothonotaries with two.

The chapeau is also sometimes used as a mark of secular dignity, such as a cap or coronet armed with ermine, worn by dukes, etc. In this case, the chapeau may be used instead of a helmet to support the individual's crest, since the rules of heraldry do not allow a crest to be placed directly on the armorial shield.

=== Anglophone heraldries ===
In the Anglophone heraldries, a "chapeau" or cap of maintenance is a specific kind of hat. It occurs as a charge, but also more importantly as an exterior ornament, signifying rank.

The use of the chapeau in English heraldry is not as clear cut and regulated as in Scottish heraldry.

== Etymology ==
The word chapeau is a 16th-century loanword from French, ultimately from medieval Latin cappellus ("type of hat"), from Latin cappa ("cape, cloak"), cognate to "cap".

== See also ==
- List of hats and headgear
