= Togolese Armed Forces =

Armed forces of Togo

- Forces Armées Togolaises
- Flag of the Togolese Armed Forces
- Service branches: Togolese Army; Togolese Air Force; Togolese Navy; Togolese National Gendarmerie
- Website: defense.gouv.tg

Leadership
- Commander-in-chief: President Jean-Lucien Savi de Tové
- Minister of Defense: Essozimna Marguerite Gnakade
- Chief of Defence Staff: Brigadier General Dimini Allaharé

Personnel
- Military age: 18

Expenditure
- Percent of GDP: 1.6%

Industry
- Foreign suppliers: Brazil; Germany; France; Italy; Netherlands; Russia; Turkey; United Kingdom; United States

Related articles
- Ranks: Military ranks of Togo

The Togolese Armed Forces (French: Forces Armées Togolaises, FAT) is the national military of the Republic of Togo which consists of the Army, Navy, Air Force, and the National Gendarmerie. The total military expenditure during the fiscal year of 2005 was 1.6% of the country's GDP. Military bases exist in Lomé, Temedja, Kara, Niamtougou, and Dapaong. The current Chief of the General Staff is Brigadier General Dimini Allaharé, who took office on May 28, 2024.

== Army ==
The current chief of staff of the army is Colonel Blakimwé Wiyao Balli. The elite presidential bodyguards of the Republic of Togo Armed Forces are reportedly trained by Benjamin Yeaten, an internationally wanted Liberian military commander and war criminal.

=== Equipment ===
==== Armor ====
| Name | Origin | Type | In service | Notes |
Armored fighting vehicle
| T-54 | Soviet Union | Main battle tank | 4 | |
| T-34-85 | Soviet Union | Medium Tank | 7 | |
| FV101 Scorpion | United Kingdom | Light tank | 20 | |
| BMP-2 | Russia | Infantry fighting vehicle | 20 | purchased 1997 from Polish Land Forces |
| UR-416 | Germany | APC | 30 | |
| Panhard M3 | France | APC | 5 | Reconnaissance vehicle |
| Véhicule Blindé Léger | France | Armored car | 2 | |
| EE-9 Cascavel | Brazil | Armored car | 36 | |
| M8 Greyhound | United States | Armored car | 9 | of which 3 are the M20 variant |
| Véhicule d'Action dans la Profondeur | France | Armored car | 6 | |
| TC-54 | France | Heavy truck | 110 | |
| Panhard AML | France | Armored car | 10 | |
Artillery
| M2A1 | United States | Howitzer | 4 | 105mm towed howitzer |
| 2S1 Gvozdika | Soviet Union | Self-propelled howitzer | 6 | |

== Air Force ==
Air Force roundel

The Republic of Togo Air Force (French: Armée de l'Air Republic of Togo) was established in 1964, and French influence remains in the choice of aircraft used. Since 2020, the air force's chief of staff is Colonel Tassounti Djato. The C-47 Skytrain was the first aircraft used; it was part of the force from 1960 to 1976. Replacing the C-47s were two DHC-5D Buffalo STOL transports in 1976. Also in the same year, Togo acquired five ex-German Air Force Fouga Magister armed jet trainers and seven EMB.326GBs from Brazil to form the Escadrille de Chasse. Togo's armed jet trainer fleet was upgraded in 1981 by the deliveries of five Alpha jets and by three piston engine Aerospatiale TB-30 Epsilons in 1986. The Fouga Magisters were returned to France in 1985.

During its existence the official name changed from Section Air der Forces armées in 1964 to Escadrille Nationale D Togolaise (ENT) in 1973, to Groupement Aerienne Togolais (GAT) in 1980, and finally to Armée de l'Air Togolaise in 1997.

At present its operations are concentrated in the Lomé Transport Base at Lomé Tokoin Airport, where the transport aircraft are based, and the Niamtougou Fighter Base at Niamtougou International Airport, where the combat units are located.

It acquired the Bayraktar TB2 UCAV from Turkish company Baykar in August 2022.

=== Aircraft ===
==== Current inventory ====
| Aircraft | Origin | Type | Variant | In service | Notes |
Transport
| Beechcraft Super King Air | United States | Utility | King Air 200 | 2 or 1 | |
| Douglas DC-8 | United States | VIP transport | | 1 | In Storage |
| Fokker F.28 | Netherlands | VIP transport | F-28-1000 | 2 | |
Helicopters
| Aérospatiale Gazelle | France | Utility | SA342L1 | 2 | |
| Aérospatiale SA 315B Lama | France | Utility | | 2 | |
| Aérospatiale Puma | France | Transport | | 1 | In storage |
| Alouette III | France | Utility | SA319 / SA316 | 2 | |
| Mil Mi-8 | Russia | Transport | Mi-8T | 2 | |
| Mil Mi-17 | Russia | Utility | Hip-H | 2 (Unconfirmed) | |
| Mil Mi-24 | Russia | Attack | Mi-35M | 2 or 3 (Unconfirmed) | |
Trainer
| Aermacchi MB-326 | Italy | Light attack / Trainer | EMB-326G | 4 | In storage |
| Alpha Jet | France | Light attack / Trainer | | 3 or 5 | In storage |
| Socata TB 30 Epsilon | France | Basic trainer | | 3 or 2 | |
UAV
| Bayraktar TB2 | Turkey | UCAV | | Unknown | |

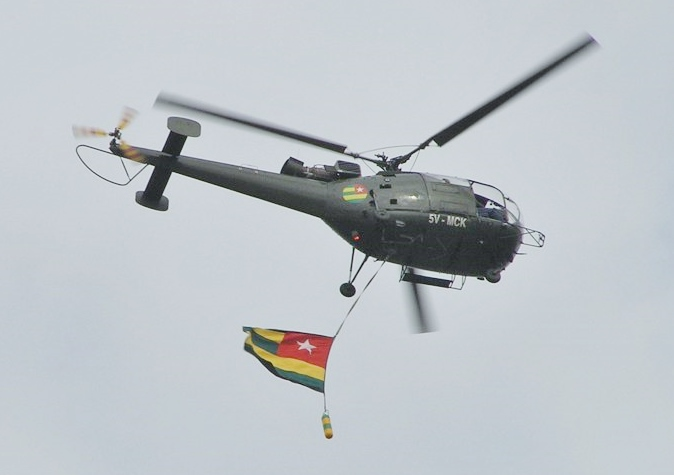
An Alouette III with the national flag beneath

=== Incidents and accidents ===
- On 6 October 2024, a Mil Mi-24V crashed. The helicopter was destroyed.
- On 4 April 2024, a Mil Mi-35 crashed. The helicopter was destroyed.
- On 26 September 2017, a Socata TB-30 Epsilon crashed. The plane was destroyed.
- On 6 October 1989, a Dassault/Dornier Alpha Jet E crashed. The pilot died and the plane was destroyed.
- On 28 August 1985, a Dassault/Dornier Alpha Jet E crashed. One of the pilots died and the plane was destroyed.
- On 18 December 1979, a Aérospatiale SA 318C Alouette Astazou crashed. All onboard died and the helicopter was destroyed. The wreckage was later rebuilt to 315B Lama.
- On 6 March 1979, a Aérospatiale SA 318C Alouette Astazou crashed. The helicopter was destroyed. The wreckage was later rebuilt to 315B Lama.
- On 26 December 1974, a Grumman American G-1159 Gulfstream II crashed. The plane was destroyed, and out of 6 occupants, 3 were killed. The plane was the presidential jet of Togo.
- On 24 January 1974, a Douglas C-47A-35-DL (DC-3) crashed. The plane was destroyed. Four people were killed, including high-ranking military personnel. The sole survivor was the president of Togo Gnassingbé Eyadéma. The plane was the presidential plane of Togo.
- On 7 March 1964, a Max Holste MH.1521M Broussard was destroyed.

== Navy ==
The National Navy (French: Marine togolaise) was created on May 1, 1976, to guard the roughly 34 miles (55 km) of Republic of Togo coast and the seaport of Lomé. It currently has 2 wooden-hulled patrol boats, the Kara (P 761), and the Mono (P 762), which have both been in service since 1976. On 7 July 2014, the Republic of Togo navy received a RPB 33 patrol boat that was named Agou (P 763). Currently, the navy's chief of staff is ship captain Atiogbé Ametsipe.

=== Equipment ===
| Vessel | Origin | Type | In service | Notes |
|---|---|---|---|---|
| Kara (P 761) | France | Patrol boat | 1 | Kara Patrol class |
| Mono (P 762) | France | Patrol boat | 1 | Kara Patrol class |
| Agou (P 763) | France | Patrol boat | 1 | RPB 33 class |
| Unknown name | France | Patrol boat | 1 | RPB 33 class |
| Unknown name | United States | Patrol boat | 3 | Defender-class boat |
