= Outline of Africa =

Second-largest and second-most populous continent

The following outline is provided as an overview of and topical guide to the continent Africa:

Africa is the world's second largest and second most populous continent, after Asia. It is famous for its savanna, its jungles, and the Sahara (desert).

== Geography of Africa ==
UN subregions of Africa

- Atlas of Africa
- List of cities in Africa
  - List of most populous cities in Africa

=== Regions of Africa ===
Regions of Africa

- List of freshwater ecoregions in Africa and Madagascar

==== Directional regions ====
- Central Africa
- East Africa
- North Africa
- Southern Africa
- West Africa
- United Nations geoscheme for Africa

==== Physiographic regions ====
- The Maghreb
- The Sahara Desert
- The Sahel
- The Sudan
- The Guinea
- The Congo
- The Great Lakes

=== Countries of Africa ===
List of African countries

- Coats of arms of Africa
- Flags of Africa

==== West Africa ====
- Benin
- Burkina Faso
- Cape Verde
- The Gambia
- Ghana
- Guinea
- Guinea-Bissau
- Ivory Coast
- Liberia
- Mali
- Mauritania
- Niger
- Nigeria
- Senegal
- Sierra Leone
- Togo

==== North Africa ====
- Algeria
- Egypt^{1}
- Libya
- Morocco
- Sudan
- Tunisia
- Western Sahara

==== Central Africa ====
- Angola
- Burundi
- Cameroon
- Central African Republic
- Chad
- Democratic Republic of the Congo
- Equatorial Guinea
- Gabon
- Republic of the Congo
- Rwanda
- São Tomé and Príncipe

==== East Africa ====
- Burundi
- Comoros
- Djibouti
- Eritrea
- Ethiopia
- Kenya
- Madagascar
- Malawi
- Mauritius
- Mozambique
- Rwanda
- Seychelles
- Somalia
- Somaliland
- South Sudan
- Tanzania
- Uganda
- Zambia
- Zimbabwe

==== Southern Africa ====
- Botswana
- Eswatini
- Lesotho
- Namibia
- South Africa

==== Dependencies ====
- British Indian Ocean Territory (UK)
- Mayotte (France)
- Réunion (France)
- St. Helena (UK)
- Canary Islands (Spain)
- Ceuta (Spain)
- Madeira (Portugal)
- Melilla (Spain)
- Socotra (Yemen)
- Pantelleria (Italy)
- Puntland (Somalia)
- Somaliland
- Sahrawi Arab Democratic Republic

=== Geographic features of Africa ===
- List of World Heritage Sites in Africa
- Glaciers in Africa
- Horn of Africa
- Impact craters in Africa
- Islands of Africa
- Rivers of Africa

=== Demography of Africa ===
Demographics of Africa

== History of Africa ==
- Afrikaner nationalism
- Bantu expansion
- Berlin Conference
- Boer Republics
- Congo Free State
- Early Congolese history
- Expulsion of Asians in Uganda in 1972
- Indophobia
- Pioneer Column
- Serer ancient history
- Serer history (medieval era to present)
- South Africa under apartheid
- Timeline of Serer history
- Volkstaat

=== History of Africa by period ===
- Prehistory
  - Pleistocene human population bottleneck in Africa
  - Prehistoric Central North Africa
- Ancient African history
  - Ancient History of South Africa
  - Copper Age in Africa
  - Iron Age in Africa
  - Olmec alternative origin speculations
- Pre-Columbian trans-oceanic contact
  - Pre-Columbian Africa-Americas contact theories
- European exploration of Africa
- Colonisation of Africa
  - Blockade of Africa
  - Scramble for Africa
- African theatre of World War I
- Decolonisation of Africa
  - Year of Africa

==== History of Africa by year ====
- 2024 in Africa
- 2016 in Africa
- 2007 in Africa
- 2006 in Africa
- 2005 in Africa
- 1960 in Africa (known as the "Year of Africa")

=== History of Africa by region ===
- History of Central Africa
- History of East Africa
- History of North Africa
- History of Southern Africa
  - Ancient History of South Africa
- History of West Africa

=== History of Africa by subject ===
- African archaeology
- Assassinations in Africa
- Economic history of Africa
- Extinct animals of Africa
- Extinct languages of Africa
- Legends of Africa
- Military history of Africa
  - African military systems to 1800
  - African military systems (1800–1900)
  - African military systems after 1900
- Natural history of Africa
- Political history of Eastern Africa
- Science and technology in Africa
- Slavery
  - African slave trade
  - Slavery in Africa

==== Empires in Africa ====
African empires

- Adal Sultanate
- Ajuran Sultanate
- Almohad Caliphate
- Almoravid Caliphate
- Aro Confederacy
- Asante Union
- Ayyubid Sultanate
- Bamana Empire
- Benin Empire
- Bornu Empire
- Ethiopian Empire
- Fatimid Caliphate
- Ghana Empire
- Kaabu Empire
- Kanem Empire
- Kong Empire
- Liberian Republic
- Luba Empire
- Lunda Empire
- Mali Empire
- Mamluk Sultanate
- Marinid dynasty
- Oyo Empire
- Sennar Sultanate
- Sokoto Caliphate
- Songhai Empire
- Wassoulou Empire
- Wolof Empire

== Culture of Africa ==
Culture of Africa

- Architecture of Africa
  - Castles in Africa
  - Mosques in Africa
  - Tallest buildings in Africa
  - Architecture of Egypt
    - Ancient Egyptian architecture
      - Egyptian pyramids
      - Urban planning in ancient Egypt
    - Egyptian Revival architecture
    - Egyptian revival decorative arts
  - Architect Africa Film Festival
  - Architecture of Ethiopia
  - Architecture of Somalia
  - Art Deco in Durban
  - Cape Dutch architecture
  - Rondavel
- Caste system in Africa
- Etiquette in Africa
- Languages of Africa
  - List of African languages
  - Endangered languages in Africa
  - Portuguese in Africa
  - Writing systems of Africa
- Prostitution in Africa
- Racism in Africa
- Slavery in modern Africa
- Writing systems of Africa
- Urbanization in Africa

=== Art in Africa ===
==== Cinema of Africa ====
- List of African films

==== Music of Africa ====
- African popular music
- Afrobeat
- Afrobeats
- Music of Africa

=== Cuisine of Africa ===
African cuisine

- Beer in Africa

=== People of Africa ===
- Chinatowns in Africa
- African diaspora
- Indigenous peoples of Africa
- List of African millionaires

==== Ethnic groups in Africa ====
Ethnic groups in Africa

- Afrikaners
- Asians in Africa
  - Asian South African
  - Chinese South Africans
  - Ethnic Chinese in Mozambique
  - Koreans in Africa
- British diaspora in Africa
- Greeks
  - Greeks in the Democratic Republic of the Congo
  - Greeks in South Africa
  - Greeks in Zimbabwe
- Indian diaspora in East Africa
- Indian South Africans
- Indians in Kenya
- Indians in Mozambique
- Serer people
- Tamil South Africans
- White Africans of European ancestry
- White South African
- Whites in Zimbabwe
- Whites in Kenya

==== Some famous individuals from Africa ====
- Aaron, first high-priest of children of Israel
- Ahmad ibn Ibrahim al-Ghazi, Imam and General of the Adal Sultanate.
- Alexander the Great, conqueror; founded Alexandria in Egypt.
- Cleopatra VII, queen of Egypt.
- Ellen Johnson Sirleaf, current President of Liberia, first elected black female head of state in the world.
- F. W. de Klerk, winner of the Nobel Peace Prize for helping end apartheid in South Africa.
- Haile Selassie I, last Emperor of Ethiopia.
- Kofi Annan, diplomat from Ghana.
- Léopold Sédar Senghor, poet and first president of Senegal.
- Miriam, sister of Moses.
- Moses, prophet who received the Ten Commandments.
- Muhammad Ahmad, ("The Mahdi"), Sudanese rebel leader and messianic Islamic reformer.
- Nefertiti, queen of Egypt.
- Nelson Mandela, political leader in South Africa.
- Ramesses II, often regarded as Ancient Egypt's greatest, most celebrated, and most powerful pharaoh.
- Shaka, legendary leader of the Zulu Kingdom.
- Tutankhamun, ("King Tut"), Egyptian pharaoh of the 18th dynasty.

=== Religion in Africa ===
Religion in Africa

- Traditional African religions
- Buddhism in Africa
- Christianity in Africa
  - Catholic Church in Africa
- Hinduism in Africa
- Judaism in Africa
- Islam in Africa
- Serer religion

=== Sports in Africa ===
- African Games
- Africa Cup of Nations
- Ethiopian Super Cup
- FIBA Africa
- Ice hockey in Africa
- List of African records in athletics

== Environment of Africa ==
- Natural history of Africa
- Environmental issues in Africa
- Fauna of Africa
  - List of primates of Africa
  - List of reptiles of Africa
  - List of snakes of Africa

== Economy and infrastructure of Africa ==
Economy of Africa

- Agriculture
  - Push–pull technology
- Banks in Africa
- Cement in Africa
- Energy in Africa
  - Power stations in Africa
  - Renewable energy in Africa
- Health care in Africa
  - HIV/AIDS in Africa
  - Hospitals in Africa
- Mineral industry of Africa
  - Mining in Africa
    - Metals
      - Aluminum in Africa
      - Copper in Africa
      - Iron ore in Africa
      - Platinum in Africa
      - Titanium in Africa
      - Uranium in Africa
  - Steel in Africa
- Natural resources of Africa
- Poverty in Africa
- Late-2000s recession in Africa
- List of African stock exchanges

=== Communications in Africa ===
Communications in Africa

- Internet in Africa
- Media of Africa
  - Newspapers in Africa
  - Radio in Africa
  - Television in Africa
- Telephone numbers in Africa

=== Transport in Africa ===
- Air transport in Africa
  - Airlines of Africa
    - List of largest airlines in Africa
  - List of the busiest airports in Africa
- Trans-African Highway network

== Education in Africa ==
Education in Africa

- Adult education in Africa
- Association of International Schools in Africa
- Universities in Africa
  - Business schools in Africa
  - Medical schools in Africa

== Governments of Africa ==
- African Union
  - African Commission on Human and Peoples' Rights

== Politics of Africa ==
Politics of Africa

- Anarchism in Africa
- Conflicts in Africa
- Monarchies in Africa
- Political parties in Africa
- Pan-Africanism

=== Foreign relations of Africa ===
- Sino-African relations

=== Law of Africa ===
Law of Africa

- Ages of consent in Africa

== See also ==
Africa

- African Leaders State of Africa Report
- African studies
- Continent
- Index of Africa-related articles
