= 2005 in Africa =

== Incumbents ==
- Algeria
  - President – Abdelaziz Bouteflika, President of Algeria (1999–2019)
  - Prime Minister – Ahmed Ouyahia, Prime Minister of Algeria (2004–2006)
- Angola
  - President – José Eduardo dos Santos, President of Angola (1979–2017)
  - Prime Minister – Fernando da Piedade Dias dos Santos, Prime Minister of Angola (2002–2008)
- Benin
  - President – Mathieu Kérékou, President of Benin (1996–2006)
- Botswana
  - President – Festus Mogae, President of Botswana (1998–2008)
- Burundi
  - President –
    1. Domitien Ndayizeye, President of Burundi (2003–2005)
    2. Pierre Nkurunziza, President of Burundi (2005–2020)
- Cameroon
  - President – Paul Biya, President of Cameroon (1982–present)
  - Prime Minister Ephraïm Inoni, Prime Minister of Cameroon (2004–2009)
- Cape Verde
  - President – Pedro Pires, President of Cape Verde (2001–2011)
  - Prime Minister – José Maria Neves, Prime Minister of Cape Verde (2001–2016)
- Central African Republic
  - President – François Bozizé, President of Central African Republic (2003–2013)
  - Prime Minister –
    1. Célestin Gaombalet, Prime Minister of Central African Republic (2003–2005)
    2. Élie Doté, Prime Minister of Central African Republic (2005–2008)
- Chad
  - President – Idriss Déby, President of Chad (1990–2021)
  - Prime Minister –
    1. Moussa Faki, Prime Minister of Chad (2003–2005)
    2. Pascal Yoadimnadji, Prime Minister of Chad (2005–2007)
- Comoros
  - President – Azali Assoumani, President of Comoros (2002–2006)
- Republic of the Congo
  - President – Denis Sassou Nguesso, President of the Republic of the Congo (1997–present)
  - Prime Minister – Isidore Mvouba, Prime Minister of the Republic of the Congo (2005–2009)
- Côte d'Ivoire
  - President – Laurent Gbagbo, President of Côte d'Ivoire (2000–2011)
  - Prime Minister – Seydou Diarra, Prime Minister of Côte d'Ivoire (2003–2005)
- Democratic Republic of the Congo
  - President – Joseph Kabila, President of the Democratic Republic of the Congo (2001–2019)
- Djibouti
  - President – Ismaïl Omar Guelleh, President of Djibouti (1999–present)
  - Prime Minister – Dileita Mohamed Dileita, Prime Minister of Djibouti (2001–2013)
- Egypt
  - President – Hosni Mubarak, President of Egypt (1981–2011)
  - Prime Minister – Ahmed Nazif, Prime Minister of Egypt (2004–2011)
- Equatorial Guinea
  - President – Teodoro Obiang Nguema Mbasogo, President of Equatorial Guinea (1982–present)
  - Prime Minister – Miguel Abia Biteo Boricó, Prime Minister of Equatorial Guinea (2004–2006)
- Eritrea
  - President – Isaias Afwerki, President of Eritrea (1993–present)
- Ethiopia
  - President – Girma Wolde-Giorgis, President of Ethiopia (2001-2013)
  - Prime Minister – Meles Zenawi, Prime Minister of Ethiopia (1995-2012)
- Gabon
  - President – Omar Bongo, President of Gabon (1967–2009)
  - Prime Minister – Jean-François Ntoutoume Emane, Prime Minister of Gabon (1999-2006)
- Gambia
  - President – Yahya Jammeh, President of Gambia (1996-2017)
- Ghana
  - President – John Kufuor, President of Ghana (2001-2009)
- Guinea
  - President – Lansana Conté, President of Guinea (1984-2008)
- Guinea-Bissau
  - President –
    1. Henrique Rosa, President of Guinea-Bissau (2003–2005)
    2. João Bernardo Vieira, President of Guinea-Bissau (2005–2009)
  - Prime Minister –
    1. Carlos Gomes Júnior, Prime Minister of Guinea-Bissau (2004–2005)
    2. Aristides Gomes, Prime Minister of Guinea-Bissau (2005–2007)
- Kenya
  - President – Mwai Kibaki, President of Kenya (2002–2013)
- Lesotho
  - Monarch – Letsie III, Monarch of Lesotho (1996–present)
  - Prime Minister – Pakalitha Mosisili, Prime Minister of Lesotho (1998–2012)
- Liberia
  - President – Gyude Bryant, Chairman of the Transitional Government (2003–2006)
- Libya
  - President – Muhammad az-Zanati, Chairman of the Presidential Council (1992–2008)
  - Prime Minister – Shukri Ghanem, Prime Minister of Libya (2003–2006)
- Malawi
  - President – Bingu wa Mutharika, President of Malawi (2004–2012)
- Mali
  - President – Amadou Toumani Touré, President of Mali (2002–2012)
  - Prime Minister – Ousmane Issoufi Maïga, Prime Minister of Mali (2004–2007)
- Mauritania
  - President –
    1. Maaouya Ould Sid'Ahmed Taya, President of Mauritania (1984–2005)
    2. Ely Ould Mohamed Vall, President of Mauritania (2005–2007)
  - Prime Minister –
    1. Sghair Ould M'Bareck, Prime Minister of Mauritania (2003–2005)
    2. Sidi Mohamed Ould Boubacar, Prime Minister of Mauritania (2005–2007)
- Mauritius
  - President – Sir Anerood Jugnauth, President of Mauritius (2003–2012)
  - Prime Minister –
    1. Paul Bérenger, Prime Minister of Mauritius (2003–2005)
    2. Dr. Navin Ramgoolam, Prime Minister of Mauritius (2005–2014)
- Morocco
  - King – Mohammed VI, King of Morocco (1999–present)
  - Prime Minister – Driss Jettou, Prime Minister of Morocco (2002–2007)
- Mozambique
  - President –
    1. Joaquim Chissano, President of Mozambique (1986–2005)
    2. Armando Guebuza, President of Mozambique (2005–2015)
  - Prime Minister – Luísa Diogo, Prime Minister of Mozambique (2004–2010)
- Namibia
  - President –
    1. Sam Nujoma, President of Namibia (1990–2005)
    2. Hifikepunye Pohamba, President of Namibia (2005–2015)
  - Prime Minister –
    1. Theo-Ben Gurirab, Prime Minister of Namibia (2002-2005)
    2. Nahas Angula, Prime Minister of Namibia (2005-2012)
- Niger
  - President – Mamadou Tandja, President of Niger (1999–2010)
  - Prime Minister – Hama Amadou, Prime Minister of Niger (2000–2007)
- Nigeria
  - President – Olusegun Obasanjo, President of Nigeria (1999-2007)
- Rwanda
  - President – Paul Kagame, President of Rwanda (2000–2007)
  - Prime Minister – Bernard Makuza, Prime Minister of Rwanda (2000–2011)
- Sao Tome and Principe
  - President – Fradique de Menezes, President of Sao Tome and Principe (2003–2011)
  - Prime Minister –
    1. Damião Vaz d'Almeida, Prime Minister of Sao Tome and Principe (2004–2005)
    2. Maria do Carmo Silveira, Prime Minister of Sao Tome and Principe (2005–2006)
- Senegal
  - President – Abdoulaye Wade, President of Senegal (2000–2012)
  - Prime Minister – Macky Sall, Prime Minister of Senegal (2004–2007)
- Seychelles
  - President – James Michel, President of Seychelles (2004–2016)
- Sierra Leone
  - President – Ahmad Tejan Kabbah, President of Sierra Leone (1998–2007)
- Somalia
  - President – Abdullahi Yusuf Ahmed, President of Somalia (2004–2008)
  - Prime Minister – Ali Mohammed Ghedi, Prime Minister of Somalia (2004–2007)
- South Africa
  - President – Thabo Mbeki, President of South Africa (1999–2008)
- Sudan
  - President – Omar al-Bashir, President of Sudan (1989–2019)
- Tanzania
  - President –
    1. Benjamin Mkapa, President of Tanzania (1995–2005)
    2. Jakaya Kikwete, President of Tanzania (2005–2015)
  - Prime Minister –
    1. Frederick Sumaye, Prime Minister of Tanzania (1995–2005)
    2. Edward Lowassa, Prime Minister of Tanzania (2005–2008)
- Togo
  - President –
    1. Gnassingbé Eyadéma, President of Togo (1967–2005)
    2. Faure Gnassingbé, President of Togo (2005)
    3. Bonfoh Abass, President of Togo (acting) (2005)
    4. Faure Gnassingbé, President of Togo (2005–present)
  - Prime Minister –
    1. Koffi Sama, Prime Minister of Togo (2002–2005)
    2. Edem Kodjo, Prime Minister of Togo (2005–2006)
- Tunisia
  - President – Zine El Abidine Ben Ali, President of Tunisia (1987–2011)
  - Prime Minister – Mohamed Ghannouchi, Prime Minister of Tunisia (1999–2011)
- Uganda
  - President – Yoweri Museveni, President of Uganda (1986–present)
  - Prime Minister – Apolo Nsibambi, Prime Minister of Uganda (1999–2011)
- Zambia
  - President – Levy Mwanawasa, President of Zambia (2002–2008)
- Zimbabwe
  - President – Robert Mugabe, President of Zimbabwe (1987–2017)

== International organisations ==
=== African Union ===
- The first summit of heads of state of the African Union's Peace and Security Council was held in Libreville (Gabon) on 10 and 11 January 2005. The summit focused on the situation in Côte d'Ivoire, Democratic Republic of the Congo and Darfur.
- The African Union summit was held on 30 and 31 January in Abuja (Nigeria). The orders of the day included food security, the struggle against pandemics such as HIV-AIDS, malaria, and polio, as well as the New Partnership for Africa's Development (NEPAD) and the resolution of conflicts on the continent, especially in Côte d'Ivoire and Darfur.

Several decisions were made during the summit:

- The establishment in Somalia of a peace force of 5000 to 7000 troops to assist in the stabilisation of the country. It hi will be organised by the Inter-Governmental Authority on Development (IGAD), that joins Somalia and its neighbouring countries. In the first stage, its mandate will be limited to protecting the installation of the Somali government.
- The deployment of a military force to disarm the Rwandan rebels, who are accused of being implicated in the 1994 genocide in Rwanda, and have since then sought refuge in the Democratic Republic of the Congo.

Kofi Annan, secretary general of the UN has sought to strengthen the partnership between the UN and the African Union for Africa to reach the Millennium Development Goals by 2015. He declared that "Africa isn't on schedule to reach the Millennium Development Goals. But it will be able to reach these goals if the world partnership, promised a long time ago, does come together completely".

The question of how to represent Africa in the best possible way in the UN Security Council was delayed, following a disagreement among the member countries of the African Union. This was referred to a committee composed of 15 countries to assemble in Swaziland from February 2005.

The mandate of the current chairman, Olusegun Obasanjo, president of Nigeria, was prolonged from July 2005 to January 2006. Next summits will be held in Libya in July 2005 and in Sudan in January 2006.

- The Executive Council of the African Union, meeting on 7 and 8 March 2005 in Addis Ababa (Ethiopia), decided to propose that Africa is represented by two permanent members of the Security Council of the UN. These representatives will need to have the same rights as the other council members, notably the veto power.
- A summit of the African Union was held in Sirte (Libya) on 4 and 5 July 2005. The African heads of states requested the G8 to totally cancel the debt of all African countries, and demanded that the continent is represented by two permanent members of the UN Security Council.

=== Economic Community of West African States (ECOWAS) ===
- On 19 January 2005, Tandja Mamadou, president of Niger, was elected president of the Economic Community of West African States, replacing John Kufuor of Ghana.
- February 2005: the ECOWAS condemned the seizure of power by Faure Gnassingbé Eyadéma in Togo following the death of his father Gnassingbé Eyadéma.

=== Economic and Monetary Community of Central Africa (CEMAC) ===
- The summit of the heads of state of the Economic and Monetary Community of Central Africa (Cemac) was held on 11 February 2005 in Libreville (Gabon). Present were the presidents of the Central African Republic (François Bozizé), of the Republic of the Congo (Denis Sassou-Nguesso), of Equatorial Guinea (Teodoro Obiang Nguema Mbasogo), of Chad (Idriss Déby), of Gabon (Omar Bongo Ondimba, present chairman of CEMAC) and Abdou Diouf, secretary general of the Organisation Internationale de la Francophonie. Paul Biya, president of Cameroon was represented by the chairman of the National Assembly. The summit mainly discussed economic aspects, notably the creation of the sub-regional airway company Air Cémac in partnership with the group Royal Air Maroc.

The summit also touched the situation in Togo and welcomed a delegation, led by Kokou Tozoun, minister of foreign affairs. A statement was made, inviting "the international community to encourage the Togo authorities to do its utmost to establish a swift and peaceful return of the peace process in the country". Omar Bongo Ondimba, present chairman of the Cemac, yielded his chair to Teodoro Obiang Nguema, president of Equatorial Guinea.

=== West African Economic and Monetary Union (UEMOA) ===
Tandja Mamadou, president of Niger returned to the chair of the UEMOA following the summit of the organisation in Niamey (Niger) on 30 March 2005. Different heads of state participated in the summit: Abdoulaye Wade (Senegal), Mathieu Kérékou (Benin), Blaise Compaoré (Burkina Faso), Amadou Toumani Touré (Mali), Henrique Rosa (Guinea-Bissau) and Tandja Mamadou (Niger). Togo was represented by Koffi Sama, prime minister, and Côte d'Ivoire by Théodore Mel Eg, minister for regional integration and the African Union. In a final communiqué, the UEMOA congratulated itself for "the results on price stability in the Union, following a better provisioning of the food markets" and "welcomed the actions intended to preserve the value of the common currency", the CFA franc.

=== Other organisations ===
- A youth forum for peace and development was held from 10/12 January 2005 in Conakry (Guinea). Organized by the UNDP (United Nations Development Programme) in collaboration with the Economic Community of West African States (ECOWAS), it joined about fifty youngsters from Côte d'Ivoire, Guinea, Liberia and Sierra Leone, representatives of student's associations, executives of national youth organizations, as well as young people from the rural zones and the border areas of these four countries. These young people committed themselves to contribute to the consolidation of peace and the development of the West African sub-region, to promote the role of the young people in the process of peace and development in Côte d'Ivoire, and within the Union of the Mano River (UFM, joining Guinea, Liberia and Sierra Leone).
- The evaluation meeting of the "Process of Bamako" (2000), bearing on the "institutions and democratic practice in the French-speaking countries", was organized in Dakar (Senegal) on 4/5 January 2005, by the Organisation internationale de la francophonie in partnership with the Haut commissariat aux Droits de l'homme et à la promotion de la Paix (High Office on Human Rights and on the Promotion of Peace) of Senegal.
- UN : Benin, non-permanent member of the Security Council since 23 October 2003 would be chair during February 2005.
- ACP countries - European Union: The 9th session of the ACP-EU Joint Parliamentary Assembly was held from 18 to 22 April 2005 in Bamako (Mali). During this session, the "countries of the south" requested the European Union to take concrete measures against poverty. In a declaration entitled Declaration of Bamako on the Millennium Development Goals, they ask for the cancellation of debts, measures aiming at laying down more equitable commercial rules, a more real partnership and an increase in the financial flow towards the developing countries. In parallel, the ACP countries must fight effectively against corruption, improve management of public expenditure, and reinforce the social measures, in particular regarding health and education.

== Conflict and civil war ==
=== Côte d'Ivoire ===
- On 11 January, Thabo Mbeki, president of South Africa, on a mission for the African Union went to Yamoussoukro, political capital of Côte d'Ivoire, to attend the Council of Ministers. The ministers of Forces Nouvelles (the rebel movement) did not attend this council. According to Agence France-Presse (AFP), their absence was interpreted to be "a sign of dissatisfaction with the conclusions of this summit, which granted president Laurent Gbagbo the right to organise a referendum to seek adoption of the revision of article 35 of the Constitution on the conditions for eligibility for the presidency of the Republic".
- On 22 January, the United Nations Operation in Côte d'Ivoire (UNOCI) authorized the Côte d'Ivoire government to repair its air fleet, destroyed on 6 November 2004 by the French soldiers of the Opération Licorne, without the possibility to re-arm them. Guillaume Soro, secretary general of the Forces Nouvelles considers this to be "a serious act within the peace process". On 23 January, during a press conference in Bouaké, he declared: "To be able to disarm, one needs an environment of confidence. One does not disarm in distrust, and even less when challenged".
- South African president Thabo Mbeki received on 23 January in Pretoria a number of representatives of the opposition to discuss the peace process. Alassane Dramane Ouattara, candidate for the Rassemblement des républicains (RDR) and Lambert Kouassi Konan, vice-president of the Democratic Party of Côte d'Ivoire (PDCI) were welcomed first, before Guillaume Soro, leader of the rebel Forces Nouvelles. Alassane Dramane Ouattara shared his wish that the presidential elections, planned for October 2005, would be organized by the United Nations for them "to be undisputed by anyone".
- The Security Council of the United Nations on 1 February unanimously adopted a resolution, presented by France, reinforcing the effectiveness of the arms embargo. Resolution 1584 authorised the blue helmets of the United Nations Operation in Côte d'Ivoire (UNOCI) and French soldiers of the Opération Licorne to inspect without notice planes and freight vehicles using the ports, airports, airfields, military bases and border posts. Pascal Affi Guessan, chair of the Front populaire ivoirien, the party of president Laurent Gbagbo, stated to be surprised and disappointed by this measure which he describes as "unnecessary provocation".
- The Secretary General of the United Nations indicates, in a report of 24 March 2005 on the situation in Côte d'Ivoire, that "in spite of the commendable efforts that President Mbeki undertook in the name of the African Union and of the encouraging prospects which opens the action plan of the African Union, the country remains actually divided". He worries about the economic decline of the country, of the ongoing violations of human rights, of the non-disarmament of the militia members and the fighters of the Forces Nouvelles. Fearing a serious confrontation in the country, he declares: "There is a real danger of the situation becoming uncontroleable, which may lead to unforeseeable consequences for the Côte d'Ivoire population and for the sub-region as a whole".
- Four political parties of the opposition, the Democratic Party of Côte d'Ivoire (PDCI), the Rassemblement des républicains (RDR), the Union for democracy and peace in Côte d'Ivoire (UDPCI) and the Mouvement des forces d'avenir (MFA), in a joint declaration, asked "the Security Council of UNO with insistence for the renewal of the mandate of the Opération Licorne and its stay in Côte d'Ivoire until the end of the electoral process, supporting the UN Forces". They expressed their support for the mediation started by Thabo Mbeki, president of South Africa and requested the Forces nouvelles to participate in the peace process.
- In a report, published on 31 March 2005, the human rights organization Human Rights Watch (HRW) states that several "hundreds of recently demobilized Liberian soldiers, among whom many children under 18" were recruited by the Côte d'Ivoire government since the beginning of the civil war.
- Thabo Mbeki, president of South Africa and mediator for the African Union for the civil war in Côte d'Ivoire assembled on 4 and 5 April in Pretoria the different protagonists of the conflict: president Laurent Gbagbo, Prime Minister Seydou Diarra, Guillaume Soro (Forces Nouvelles), Alassane Ouattara (Rassemblement des républicains), Henri Konan Bédié (Parti démocratique de Côte d'Ivoire). An agreement to end the hostilities was reached which envisages the disarmament of the rebel forces and the different pro government militia. The question about eligibility for the presidency of the Republic could not be resolved. Thabo Mbeki has given himself one week to make proposals, after having consulted Olusegun Obasanjo, president of Nigeria and of the African Union, and Kofi Annan, Secretary General of the UNO. The presidential election remains scheduled for October 2005. Laurent Gbagbo was pleased with this agreement, as was the African Union, whose commission president Alpha Oumar Konaré congratulated the mediation by Thabo Mbeki. Guillaume Soro announced the imminent return to the government of the Forces nouvelles ministers.

=== Democratic Republic of the Congo ===
- On 10 January, the Peace and Security Council of the African Union, meeting in Libreville (Gabon), decided in favour of assistance to Kinshasa for the disarmament of the old genocide forces (Interahamwe militia and ex-FAR (Rwandan Armed Forces of the former regime), moved to the Democratic Republic of the Congo since 1994.
- The office of the United Nations High Commissioner for Refugees (UNHCR) announced on 17 January that at least 15.000 Congolese took refuge in Uganda since 11 January, fleeing the insecurity reigning in the east of the Democratic Republic of the Congo.
- 25 January : release of the report on the Democratic Republic of the Congo by the group of experts formed according to resolution 1552 (arms embargo) of the UN Security Council.
- MONUC, Mission of the United Nations (UN) in the Democratic Republic of the Congo (DRC) announced on 2 February that the 9000 inhabitants of the area of Tché, in Ituri, are under protection of the UN, after disturbances that caused 52 deaths the days before.
- Ituri: the Mission of the United Nations in the Democratic Republic of the Congo (MONUC) announced Wednesday 9 February that the prosecutor of Bunia in Ituri started legal proceedings after the attacks allotted to the militia members of the nationalists and integrationists front in the area of Tché since 19 January. These attacks caused 52 deaths, mainly women, children and elderly people. Since 29 January, more than 10.000 people sought the protection of the UN in Tché.
- In Ituri, an area with interethnic violence that caused 50.000 deaths (and 500,000 displaced) since 1999, a group of 4000 militia members of the Forces armées du peuple congolais (FAPC) decided to depose arms and to adhere to the national disarmament, demobilization and reintegration program. The militia members who disarm have the choice between being integrated in the regular army or to join the civil life.
- In a report published on 7 March 2005, the organization Human Rights Watch (HRW) denounces the fact that "less than one dozen attackers were prosecuted" whereas tens of thousands of women and young girls were violated since 1998 by the soldiers and the militia members in the east of the Democratic Republic of the Congo.
- The United Nations Security Council unanimously adopted on 30 March 2005 Resolution 1592 by which it extends, until 1 October 2005, the mandate of the Mission of the United Nations in the Democratic Republic of the Congo (MONUC). It reaffirms its concern for the "hostilities that the armed groups and militia continue to maintain in the east of the Democratic Republic of the Congo, in particular in the provinces of North and South Kivu and in the district of Ituri" and requests the government to bring to justice the persons responsible for the "serious violations of human rights and of the international humanitarian law". It considers "that the presence of elements of the former "Rwandan Armed Forces" and the Interahamwe remains a threat on the local civil populations and an obstacle for the good neighbourship relations between the Democratic Republic of the Congo and Rwanda" and invites the African Union to co-operate with the MONUC.

=== Sudan ===
==== South-Sudan ====
A final agreement of peace in South-Sudan was signed on 9 January 2005 in Nairobi between the Sudanese vice-president Ali Osman Taha and John Garang, leader of the southern rebels of the Sudan People's Liberation Army (SPLA), putting a term to the longest conflict in Africa (21 years), that killed 1,5 million. During a 6-year period, this agreement envisages broad autonomy for the south of Sudan which will have its own government and an autonomous army. At the end of this period, a self-determination referendum will be organized. The income resulting from oil will be shared in equal share between the south and north. In addition, the government will have 70% of the positions in the central administration against 30% for the southern rebels. Lastly, the Sharia (Islamic law) will be into force only in the north of the country, with Muslim majority. It will not be applied in the south, having a Christian and animist majority. On 10 January, thousands of Sudanese expressed their joy in the streets of Khartoum. The National Liberation Council of the Sudan People's Liberation Movement (SPLM) ratified unanimously on 24 January the peace agreement in Rumbek.

- The Security Council of the UN unanimously adopted Resolution 1590 on 24 March presented by the United States which envisages the sending of a United Nations Mission in Sudan (Unmis) made up of 10 000 soldiers and 715 civil police officers in order to "support the implementation of the peace agreement" in South-Sudan, signed in January 2005 by the government and the Sudan People's Liberation Movement/Army (SPLM/A) of John Garang. This mission has an initial mandate of 6 months.
- At the donor conference which took place 11 and 12 April in Oslo (Norway), the financial sponsors promised to give 4,5 billion dollars for the reconstruction of Sudan, devastated by 21 years of civil war.
- John Garang, leader of the former rebels in South-Sudan became vice-president of Sudan on 9 July in accordance with the peace agreement of January 2005.
- After the death of John Garang on 30 July 2005, he was replaced by Salva Kiir on 11 August 2005.

==== Darfur ====
- The African Union decided to deploy a peacekeeping force in Darfur. The force should in the long term be made up of 3.320 men.
- On 26 January an air raid took place on a village in Darfour, killing a hundred people. Adam Thiam, spokesman of the African Union declared that it was "the most serious attack performed these last months. It is more than a very serious violation of the cease-fire because it is not an isolated act". The acts of violence multiply these last weeks, a few days from the summit of the African Union which will be devoted in particular to the situation in Darfur.
- Kofi Annan, secretary-general of the UN, invited the United Nations on 1 February to take urgent action to put an end to the massacres in the area of Darfur in the south of Sudan. In a report, submitted the day before, UNO accuses the Sudanese government and the Arab militia to have committed in Darfur "serious violations" of the international law, equivalent to "war crimes" or "crimes against humanity", referring to the generalized practice of torture, rape, murder and plundering of civilians.
- On 13 February 2005, Kofi Annan, Secretary General of the United Nations called upon NATO and the European Union "to seriously study what they can undertake concretely to help to put an end to" the tragedy that is the war in Darfur, causing during the last two years the death of several tens of thousands and the displacement of 1,6 million.
- In a conference at the Agence France-Presse (AFP) on 14 March 2005, Jan Egeland, United Nations Undersecretary-General for Humanitarian Affairs and Emergency Relief Coordinator, stated that the conflict in Darfour killed at least 180 000 during the last 18 months, an average of 10 000 deaths per month. These figures count people dying because of deprivations and diseases.
- The United Nations Security Council adopted on 29 March 2005 by 12 votes for and three abstentions (Algeria, China and Russia) a resolution presented by the United States installing sanctions (freezing of assets and prohibition of moving abroad) for those recognized guilty of having committed atrocities or threatening the peace process. A commission consisting in representatives of the 15 Member States of the Security Council will be charged to nominate these persons. The resolution also extends the embargo on arms and forbids the government to carry out offensive military flights over Darfur. The Ministry of Foreign Affairs esteems that this resolution, that it judges "unbalanced and inappropriate", does not take in account the "government efforts to deal with the questions related with politics, safety and the humanitarian situation in Darfur".
- The United Nations Security Council adopted on 30 March 2005 by 11 votes for and 4 abstentions (Algeria, Brazil, China and the United States) a resolution allowing to bring the authors of exactions (murder, rapes or plunderings) in Darfour before the International Criminal Court (ICC). The United States, opposed to the International Criminal Court stated that these nationals cannot be judged there. Thus, the resolution provides that "the citizens, responsible now or in the past, or the personnel of a State non-party to the Treaty of Rome on the International Criminal Court, will be subjected to the exclusive jurisdiction of this State for any act supposedly related to operations in Sudan".
- The Peace and Security Council of the African Union approved on 28 April the reinforcement of its peacekeeping force in Darfur. Its manpower will pass from 2200 to 7700 men.

=== Political crisis in Togo ===
On 5 February 2005, president Gnassingbé Eyadéma died after having led Togo for 38 years. According to the constitution, the chairman of the National Assembly should have been acting president until new presidential elections, to be held in 60 days. The army however decided to bring to power a son of the late president, Faure Gnassingbé Eyadéma. To endorse the decision of the army, the parliament urgently modified the constitution. The African Union, the ECOWAS, the UN, the European Union condemned what they called a "coup d'etat" and demanded the re-establishment of the constitutional order. In spite of a ban on public demonstrations issued by the government, the principal opposition parties demanded free and pluralist elections and appealed each day for peaceful demonstrations, which gathered several hundreds to a few thousand people. These were dispersed by the police, using teargas. On 25 February Faure Gnassingbé Eyadéma renounced from the position of president of the Republic, and announced to be standing as a candidate to the presidential elections, to be held on 24 April 2005. Abass Bonfoh, vice-president of the National Assembly became acting president.

Four candidates presented themselves at the election of 24 April: Faure Gnassingbé Eyadéma, supported by the Rassemblement du peuple togolais (RPT), Emmanuel Bob Akitani, candidate for the coalition of the radical opposition, Harry Olympio, candidate for the Rassemblement pour le soutien à la démocratie et au développement (RSDD, moderate opposition) and Nicolas Lawson, a businessman who withdrew his candidature on 22 April. The campaign was held in a climate of violence. The opposition denounced the conditions in which they had to prepare, and request a postponement of the election. Two days before the poll, François Boko, Minister for the Interior of the temporary government, requested the postponement of the scrutiny. In a press conference, he denounced "a suicidal electoral process". He was then forced to resign.

The election took place on 24 April. It is marked by much violence, resulting in dozens of deaths. The results were proclaimed on 26 April: Faure Gnassingbé, wins the election with 60.22% of the votes, before Emmanuel Bob Akitani with 38.19% and Harry Olympio with 0.55%. After the announcement, there was an outbreak of demonstrations in several cities of the country, denouncing the massive fraud. Clashes between demonstrators and the police occurred, involving hundreds of victims, died or wounded. Thousands of Togolese took refuge in Benin. ECOWAS, the European Union and France recognized the victory of Faure Gnassingbé Eyadema and called for the installation of a government of national unity. This was rejected by the radical opposition, that requested the cancellation of the elections because of the massive fraud.

On 8 June, Edem Kodjo, president of the Convergence patriotique panafricaine (CPP, moderate opposition), is appointed Prime Minister.

== Elections ==
- Burkina Faso: Incumbent President Blaise Compaoré is re-elected in the 2005 Presidential Elections on 13 November. See also: Politics of Burkina Faso
- Burundi: In the Communal, National Assembly and Senate Elections of 2005 held on 3 June, the National Council for the Defense of Democracy-Forces for the Defense of Democracy (NCDD-FDD) dominated the communal councilors, National Assembly and Senate. See also: Politics of Burundi
- Djibouti: Incumbent President Ismail Omar Guelleh won the Presidential Elections on 8 April unopposed. The opposition headed a massive boycott of the elections, alleging that they were undemocratic and rigged. See also: Politics of Djibouti
- Ethiopia: In the General Elections held on 15 May, the Ethiopian People's Revolutionary Democratic Front (EPRDF) won a majority of 327 out of the 547 total seats in the House of Peoples' Representatives. The opposition claimed that the elections were fraudulent and unfair, sparking a wave of demonstrations in Addis Ababa, which were only stopped with the arrival of the police and military. See also: Politics of Ethiopia
- Gabon: Africa's longest-serving ruler, incumbent President Omar Bongo Ondimba garners 79.18% of the vote in the 2005 Presidential Elections on 27 November, winning another 7-year term. See also: Politics of Gabon
- Guinea:

== Environment ==
- Biodiversity : While French president Jacques Chirac organized a summit on biodiversity, bringing together scientists and politicians, the nongovernmental organizations Greenpeace and Friends of the Earth organized in Paris a counter-summit from 24 to 27 January 2005 on the topic "how finally pass from discours to acts to protect biodiversity?" It was mainly focussed on saving the rainforests and more particularly on the Congo Basin forest.
- Congo: An international summit on sustainable forestry in central Africa took place on 1 February in Brazzaville, in the presence of the presidents of Cameroun (Paul Biya), Gabon (Omar Bongo Ondimba), Chad (Idriss Déby), the Central African Republic (François Bozizé) and Equatorial Guinea (Teodoro Obiang Nguema Mbasogo), as well as French president Jacques Chirac.
  - The NGOs of central Africa denounced the refusal of the organizers to invite them to this conference and to hear their claims. Belmond Tchoumba of the Centre Camerounais pour l'Environnement et le Développement (Cameroun Environment and Development Centre) deplored that "all these people hold us in unacceptable contempt". Euloge N'Zobo, of the Observatoire Congolais des Droits de l'Homme (Congolese Observatory for Human Rights) noted that "the acts of conservation do not pay attention to those primarily concerned".
  - Isidore Mvouba, Congolese Prime Minister proposed the creation of a Panafrican system of certification of forest products for export, which would support commercialisation and make it possible to fight against illegal cuts.
- Great Apes: Joseph Kabila, president of the Democratic Republic of the Congo, announced on 5 February in Brazzaville the organisation in Kinshasa in September 2005 of the first intergovernmental world conference on Great Apes. In Central Africa, four species of Great Apes are threatened with extinction, because of deforestation and the various wars that have been held there these last years.
- Democratic Republic of the Congo: a report by the Institut Congolais pour la Conservation de la Nature (Institute for Nature Conservation) denounces the massacre of hundreds of elephants by poachers and soldiers in the Epulu reserve in the North-East of the country. An ivory traffic developed in 2004 in spite of the fact that the elephant is protected by the Convention on the International Trade in Endangered Species of Wild Flora and Fauna (CITES), which prohibits ivory trade.
- Desertification: a regional workshop on the implementation of the United Nations Convention to Combat Desertification (CCD) was held in Ouagadougou (Burkina Faso) on 11 February and brought together the "focal points" of the CCD, the non-governmental organizations and the United Nations Development Programme (UNDP). Being organized by the CILSS (Permanent Interstate Committee for drought control in the Sahel), it gave the participants the opportunity to exchange their experiences on the fight against desertification.
- The second African congress on oil joined in Algiers on 16 and 17 February 2005 the ministers for energy of twelve oil-producing countries of the African continent, and examined the means necessary to fight the pollution of the Mediterranean and African coasts by hydrocarbons.
- Somalia: The United Nations Environment Programme made public on 23 February 2005 a report which reveals that the tsunami of 26 December 2004 surfaced radioactive waste immersed illegally by Western countries on the coasts of Somalia in the 1980s and 1990s.
- Uganda: Dr. Aryamanya Mugisha, executive of the National Environment Management Authority (NEMA) announced in February that the production and importation of plastic bags would be prohibited in Uganda before the end of the year.
- The United Nations Food and Agriculture Organization (FAO) estimated on 26 May 2005 that "the climatic change threatens to increase the number of famished in the world by reducing the surface of farm lands in the developing countries" and particularly in the countries of sub-Saharan Africa because of "their low capacity to adapt to the climatic change or to compensate for the fall of production with the import of food".
- Benin: On 1 June, the "National Day of the Tree", instituted in 1985, Fatiou Akplogan, minister for agriculture, invited each Beninese to plant a tree to limit the effects of desertification.
- Environmental education: opening in Ouagadougou of the Planet'ERE forum devoted to environmental education. The third edition of this French-speaking forum was inaugurated by Blaise Compaoré, president of Burkina Faso in the presence of Amadou Toumani Touré, president of Mali and Hama Amadou, prime minister of Niger.

== Human and natural catastrophes ==
- Democratic Republic of the Congo: during the night of Saturday 1 January, torrential rains caused a death and destroyed a hundred houses in Uvira.
- During the African Union summit in Libreville on 10 January 2005, Gabonese president Omar Bongo Ondimba proposed the creation of an African organization of urgent humanitarian intervention in the event of natural disaster or conflict.
- On the occasion of the world conference on prevention of natural disasters, Salvano Briceno, responsible for the international strategy of the UN for the prevention of disasters, insisted on the fact that "it is very important to concentrate on Africa because the vulnerability of the African countries is big". According to a study of the UN, 80% of the biological disasters (mainly associated with epidemics) took place in Africa during the decade 1994–2003.
- Migratory locusts: the FAO recommends the countries of Western and North-Western Africa (Mali, Senegal, Mauritania, Gambia, Guinea-Bissau, Morocco, Algeria) to continue the fight against the migratory locusts and to remain vigilant in spite of the recent improvements. An international scientific seminar on the migratory locust was organized in Dakar from 11 to 13 January. Senegalese president Abdoulaye Wade calls upon "all the Heads of State, both of the developed countries and of those in the developing process, all the sponsors and all the specialized agencies, to combine our efforts, in order to end this plague, which goes back in the mists of time".
- Madagascar: a tropical storm, baptized Ernest, struck the island of Madagascar on 22 and 23 January. A provisional assessment of 28 January counts 7 dead and 79 disappeared in the south of the island. Nearly a thousand people are affected.
- Nigeria: vice-president Atiku Abubakar announced on 4 February the installation of an advanced alarm system against urgencies and catastrophes, which should cover all West Africa.
- Mozambique: the regional Water Administration of the Zambezi announced on 9 February 2005 that the floods caused by the rise of the level of the immense Zambezi river, due to strong rains since the end of January, have already affected 18.825 people, mainly peasants of the provinces of Tete and Sofala (center of Mozambique). Approximately 15 square kilometres of crops (rice, maize/corn, peanut and cassava/manioc) are lost.
- Mali: The Social, Cultural and Economic Council of Mali is studying during two weeks the different questions related to prevention and management of natural disasters with the objective to provide suggestions and recommendations to the authorities on prevention and management of environmental catastrophes (bush fires and deforestation, air and water pollution, sedimentation of rivers and proliferation of the water hyacinth in the Niger River bed).
- Ethiopia: in the area of Somalia, 70 km to the east of Addis Ababa, the rise of the Shebelle River in April 2005 brought with it floods in more than 30 villages, causing the death of 134 people. Aid has trouble to arrive because of the presence of many crocodiles in the disaster zone.

== Water ==
- An international water conference organized by the African Development Bank took place on 31 March 2005 in Paris in order to advance the African project "Initiative for Water Supply and Sanitation in Rural Africa". Omar Kabbaj, president of the African Development Bank, announced that "the balance of the resource needs stands at about 460 million dollars per year up to the end of 2007. It is our hope that the international donor community would, over time, rise to the challenge of financing the remaining resource requirements".

== Health ==
=== Malaria ===
- Following the recommendations of the World Health Organization, Nigeria decided to stop the prescription of chloroquine, the parasite responsible for malaria becoming resistant to this molecule used until today. Nigeria will be using Artemisinin, a more effective but also more expensive drug.
- The "Africa Live" festival, held in Dakar (Senegal) on 12 and 13 March 2005, presented several great names of African music, like Malians Ali Farka Touré, Salif Keita, Oumou Sangaré, Rokia Traoré, Tinariwen, Tiken Jah Fakoly of Côte d'Ivoire, Cameroonian Manu Dibango, Algerian Khaled, Senegalese Didier Awadi, Baaba Maal and Youssou N'Dour, and the French rapper Joey Starr. These concerts are dedicated to the fight against malaria in Africa, responsible for the death of a child every 30 seconds on the African continent.
- Senegal: The Global Fund to Fight AIDS, Tuberculosis and Malaria refused to grant a complementary financing, requested by Senegal for the fight against malaria, considering that the first phase of the program had not reached the expected results.
- A study by the team of Robert Snow of the Kenya Medical Research Institute in Nairobi, published on 10 March 2005 in Nature estimates that approximately 515 million people were infected by malaria in 2002. 70% of the cases were recorded in Africa. This disease is responsible for the death of a million people each year, of which 90% in Africa.
- The 5th Forum of the Roll Back Malaria (RBM) Partnership was held from 14 to 19 November in Yaoundé, Cameroon. It brought together 1500 researchers, doctors and politicians to make a state of affairs and "to launch a call to urgent action to contain the most devastating killer in Africa, malaria".

=== Aids ===
- Nelson Mandela, former president of South Africa and well known face of the combat against apartheid, announced on 6 January at a press conference in Johannesburg, that his 56-year-old son Makghato Mandela died of HIV-AIDS. "Speaking out is the only means of stopping AIDS being seen as an extraordinary disease, causing people to go to hell rather than to paradise", declared the man that for several years fights the taboo and discriminations related to this disease.
- Guinea-Bissau: Brazil will offer an antiretroviral treatment to Guinean AIDS patients (officially 43 000) following an agreement signed by the two countries which also includes medical staff training and care for hiv positives.
- Madagascar: the African Development Fund (ADF) decided on 17 January on a grant of nine million dollars for the fight against AIDS and sexually transmitted diseases, with which Madagascar will provide blood transfusion safety and better access to preventive and curative care.
- The fourth edition of the "Scenarios from Africa" contest was launched on 1 February. It is aimed at young Africans of less than 25 years. Coordinated by the "Global Dialogues" trust, it has the objective to associate young Africans with the production of HIV/Aids sensibilisation messages
- The second conference of African First Ladies on AIDS was held in Ouagadougou on 9 February 2005.
- Côte d'Ivoire : IRIN, the United Nations news service in an article of 11 February 2005 entitled "Côte d'Ivoire: HIV/AIDS time-bomb ticking away in rebel north," declares that the enduring conflict in Côte d'Ivoire is likely to cause a true explosion of the AIDS epidemic, in particular because of the non-access to medical care of the population living in the north, the area controlled by the Forces nouvelles.
- The Joint United Nations Programme on HIV and AIDS (UNAIDS) on 4 March 2005 published a report entitled "AIDS in Africa: Three scenarios to 2025" in which it indicates that nearly 90 million Africans are threatened by the AIDS virus between today and 2025 if nothing is done to stop the plague and to more generously finance the distribution of medicine.
- Mali: Malick Sène, executive secretary of the Haut conseil de lutte contre le sida (High Council of Fight Against AIDS, HCLCS), announced on 17 March 2005 during the official launch ceremony of the Multisector anti-AIDS Project (MAP) that the World Bank will finance this project up to 25,5 million dollars. Although Mali has a "non-alarming" prevalence rate of 1.7%, Malick Sène revealed that the determining factors in the propagation of AIDS in the country are very alarming: ignorance of AIDS by the young, large mobility of people, a weak cover by medical infrastructure of the territory and cultural practices and traits feminizing the plague.
- Zimbabwe: The United Nations Children's Fund (UNICEF) applied on 18 March to the international community for financial assistance for Zimbabwe to fight AIDS. This country, that did not receive aid since 2004, has one of the highest HIV infection rates in the area, with 24.6% of the population affected, or 1,8 million people living with the virus.
- In Durban, South Africa, the World Health Organization (WHO) organized from 11 to 13 April a meeting, joining specialists and social workers of 20 African countries, discussing the problems of nutrition of AIDS patients. In Africa, according to Lee Jong-Wook, director general of the WHO, "the majority of the 30 million people infected by HIV does not have secure access to the fundamental nutrients that any human being requires to stay in good health".
- Ethiopia: according to a study of United Nations experts, published in Addis Ababa on 13 April 2005, the number of AIDS deaths, which amounted to 900 000 in 2003, could double between today and 2008 "if the current tendency persists".
- The United Nations Food and Agriculture Organization (FAO) indicates in an official statement that "of the 34 million orphans in sub-Saharan Africa, more than 11 million are AIDS orphans. It is estimated that towards 2010, up to 20 million children could lose one or both parents because of the disease. These children constitute a population at risk that should be protected from malnutrition, diseases and sexual exploitation". The FAO established 34 schools in Kenya, Mozambique, Namibia and Zambia to educate a thousand orphans in agricultural techniques.

=== Cholera ===
- An epidemic of cholera rages in Bujumbura, the capital of Burundi. On 20 January, a United Nations executive announced that 105 people were infected and that 5 deaths had been recorded.
- Senegal: The Minister for health and prevention confirmed on 28 February that the town of Touba (Diourbel area) was affected by cholera. An epidemic is to be feared in this town of two million inhabitants which does not have a water treatment network. The epidemic spread to several areas of the Country. An evaluation by the ministry for health on 9 April stated 6059 cases and 81 deaths since 28 March. On 6 April, Prime Minister Macky Sall announced the installation of a crisis cell to fight the propagation of cholera in Senegal. A day of national mobilization against cholera took place on the public radio Radio Senegal On Wednesday 13 April to "launch new behavior in the population which will help them protect themselves".
- Equatorial Guinea: an epidemic of cholera rages since the beginning of February in Malabo and Bata. According to the World Health Organization (WHO), on 10 March 2005 4400 cases of cholera were listed, involving 30 deaths. Certain medical sources suggest more than one hundred deaths.
- Democratic Republic of the Congo: epidemic of cholera in refugee camps in Ituri, mainly in the camp of Kafé, east of Bunia. The United Nations Office for the Coordination of Humanitarian Affairs (OCHA) listed 433 cases between 26 March and 3 April, including 20 deaths.
- Cameroon: epidemics of cholera rage in several areas of the country. In the Moungo division, on 12 April fifteen deaths and a hundred cases were counted two weeks after the start of the epidemic. In the province of Bafoussam, 40 cases of cholera were recorded on 13 April.
- Guinea-Bissau: an epidemic of cholera rages since 11 June. On 4 July 1027 cases were listed, involving 12 deaths. The epidemic, that started in the capital Bissau, propagated into several areas.
- Niger: an epidemic of cholera rages in Niger since July. 383 cases, of which 46 mortal, were recorded on 18 September.

=== Dracunculiasis (Guinea Worm Disease) ===
- Mali president Amadou Toumani Touré expressed his disappointment with his country's results in eradicating the Guinea Worm Disease. Mali has seen a reduction of 58% of the cases, Togo of 63%, Nigeria of 66% and Burkina Faso of 73%. According to the World Health Organization, Senegal is the first African country to have eradicated this disease.

=== Pneumonic plague ===
- Democratic Republic of the Congo: the World Health Organization (WHO) confirmed on 3 March 2005 that 16 deaths caused by the pneumonic plague (of 57 suspected cases) were recorded in the North-East of the country.

=== Poliomyelitis ===
- The Ministers for health of Niger, Nigeria, Egypt, Burkina Faso, Côte d'Ivoire, the Central African Republic, Sudan and Chad met on 13 January 2005 in Geneva in the headquarters of the World Health Organization. They decided to organize a series of vaccination campaigns against poliomyelitis and to reinforce epidemiologic monitoring. In 2004, the number of African children infected by poliomyelitis doubled to 1.037.
- In Sudan, a vaccination campaign against poliomyelitis started in Upper Nile and Bahr al Ghazal (Sudan). A million children under five will be vaccinated soon.
- Nigeria and Benin: Olusegun Obasanjo, president of Nigeria and Mathieu Kérékou, president of Benin, met in February 2005 on the border between the two countries to launch the last stage of their poliomyelitis eradication plan. Tandja Mamadou, president of Niger, could not be present.
- Launch of the second Days of synchronized vaccination against poliomyelitis for approximately 80 million children from 0 to 5 years in the countries of Central and West Africa on 8 April 2005. In Mali 3,6 million children are involved, in Cameroon 4 million children, 2 million in Guinea, 2 million in Benin.

=== Marburg hemorrhagic fever ===
- Angola: an epidemic of the Marbourg fever raged in Angola. 280 deaths was listed on 2 May 2005, 7 of the 18 provinces are affected. It principally affects the province of Uige, on the border with the Democratic Republic of the Congo. The epidemic broke out in October 2004 but worsened since early March 2005. There is no vaccine nor medical treatment against this extremely contagious disease. Victims show a high fever followed by internal and external bleedings. The virus is transmitted through bodily fluids of a patient. It initially affected children under five years. The medical personnel is now affected.
- The Democratic Republic of the Congo was put on "general alert" on 30 March 2005 with the installation of a "quarantine line" in the province of Bas-Congo, bordering on Angola.
- The World Health Organization estimated on 8 April that the border countries of Angola (Namibia, Republic of the Congo, Democratic Republic of the Congo and Zambia) should be "vigilant".
- Angola: on 19 September, the World Health Organization (WHO) announced that the epidemic could be declared finished in three weeks. No new case had been recorded for 21 days. The epidemic affected 374 people and killed 329, according to medical authorities and the WHO.

=== Ebola ===
- Republic of the Congo: at least 9 people died between 4 and 14 May of a disease, of which the symptoms point to Ebola virus disease.

=== Yellow fever ===
- Mali: an epidemic of yellow fever broke out in the area of Kayes, where 35 suspected cases, 14 of which resulted in death, were identified between 7 and 27 October.

=== Sickle-cell disease ===
- The World General Assembly against Sickle-cell disease took place from 14 to 17 June 2005 in Brazzaville (Republic of the Congo). Sickle-cell disease is a genetic blood disease, primarily touching Africa.
- Republic of the Congo: the government announced the establishment within the Centre hospitalier universitaire (CHU) in Brazzaville of a research and action center for sickle-cell disease.

=== Meningitis ===
- Sudan: the United Nations announced that 27 cases of meningitis, involving two deaths, were referenced in Darfur. The UN asked the World Health Organization to provide 160 000 vaccine doses.
- Ethiopia: an epidemic rages since November 2004. Tiruwork Tafesse, Ethiopian health minister, announced on 13 April that 433 cases were listed, causing 40 deaths. A vaccination campaign is being carried out.

=== Tuberculosis ===
- The African health ministers, meeting in Maputo (Mozambique) during the 55th session of the Regional Commission on Africa of the World Health Organization (WHO), decided to make the fight on tuberculosis an urgency, since this disease is responsible for the death of 540 000 Africans each year..

=== Typhoid fever ===
- South Africa: an epidemic of typhoid fever broke out in September in the province of Mpumalanga. 526 cases were referenced, of which 4 deaths, according to a report published Monday 19 September. Treatment Action Campaign (TAC), the principal AIDS activist organization, considers this assessment to be underestimated and reports 49 deaths.

=== Vaccination ===
- Annual meeting of the directors of the Expanded Programme on Immunization (EPI), West Africa block, of the World Health Organization (WHO) from 24 to 28 January 2005 in Ouagadougou (Burkina Faso).

=== Infant and maternal mortality ===
- Family planning: a conference on the repositioning of family planning in West Africa was held in Accra (Ghana) from 15 to 18 February 2005. West Africa is the area with the highest infant and maternal mortality rates on the African continent. More than 8.000 women die every year while giving birth.
- Madagascar: according to a demographic study, reported by news service Xinhua, approximately 100 000 children under the age of five die each year of malaria, diarrhea and respiratory infections, exacerbated by malnutrition.
- On the occasion of the World Health Day on 7 April 2005 (this year's theme was "Make every mother and child count"), Dr. Luis Gomes Sambo, director of WHO Africa, recalling that in Africa "every 60 minutes 130 new-born babies die from causes that are largely preventable", invited the African governments to reinforce health systems with qualified personnel.

=== Other health aspects ===
- Morocco: installation of basic medical insurance for active and retired employees of the public and private sector and their beneficiaries, affecting approximately 5 million people (17% of the population).

== Children's rights ==
- Kofi Annan, United Nations Secretary General, presented on 16 February 2005 at the UN Security Council an extended action plan for systematic monitoring and signaling of cruelty against children (recruitment of child soldiers, abduction, mutilation, murder, rape or other sexual ill-treatment of children, attacks on schools or hospitals) in conflict areas. Although the report notes improvements in several countries (Angola, Ethiopia, Erythrea, Liberia, Sierra Leone), it includes a list of countries where the situation is alarming, in particular Burundi, Côte d'Ivoire, Democratic Republic of the Congo, Somalia, Sudan and Uganda.
- Birth registration: the United Nations Children's Fund (UNICEF) and the United Nations Population Fund (UNFPA), in association with the non-governmental organization Plan International, launched on 28 February 2005 (in the margins of the Panafrican Festival of cinema and television of Ouagadougou (Burkina Faso)) a campaign to promote birth registration in West and Central Africa. The organizations specify: "In sub-Saharan Africa, seven new-born babies out of ten aren't recorded at the registry office (...) Without certificate of birth, the children have more problems accessing basic social services (health, education, etc.) In addition, they are without legal protection and vulnerable to any form of exploitation".
- UNICEF's "Prize for the Promotion of Children’s Rights" was handed out during the 19th edition of the Panafrican Film and Television Festival of Ouagadougou on 4 March 2005 to the Senegalese director Ben Diogaye Bèye for his film Un amour d'enfant ("A child's love"). The "Prize for Children’s Rights" was presented to Ntshavheni Wa Muruli (South Africa) for "The Wooden Camera".
- Republic of the Congo: The ministry for social affairs organized on 25 March a deliberation meeting on care for the street children, with participation of non-governmental organizations, UNICEF, UNESCO and the International Rescue Committee (IRC). More than one thousand children live in the streets of the capital Brazzaville.
- Morocco: According to a study of the Ministry of Labour and the International Programme on the Elimination of Child Labour, made public in April, approximately 600 000 Moroccan children work, that is 11% of Moroccan children.
- Benin: from 2–9 May, the NGO Plan Bénin organized in Cotonou a workshop on comic strips for children and teenagers of Benin, Burkina Faso, Guinea-Bissau, Mali and Togo. These children can use comic strips to express themselves about their rights and about their vision of development.
- A regional consultation on violence against children in Central and Western Africa took place in Bamako (Mali) on 24 and 25 May 2005. It was organized by the United Nations Children's Fund (UNICEF) and the Malian government, and brought together delegates of governments and NGO's of 24 countries and international organizations. They issued several recommendations towards African governments on the protection of children against violence (adoption and application of laws prohibiting corporal punishment and all forms of violence within the family, increased sensitizing of parents to assume responsibility for the nonviolent education of their children, punishment of sexual abuse of children by teachers, creation of council centers and training of counselors for child victims of violence, increase in the number of juvenile courts) and on the participation of children in all the stages of the development process of projects, programs and policies in their favour, as well as on the support of initiatives, developed by children to fight violence. They request the increase of budgets for child protection programmes and the generalization of child benefit systems to fight poverty.

== Demography ==
- A scientific report by the Catholic University of Leuven (UCL) was submitted on 8 March 2005 to Panapress news agency in Brussels:
  - The demographic growth in Africa was 2.4% in 2001. The fertility rate was 5,5 children per woman (1,8 to 3,5 in the rest of the world). In West Africa, it reaches 7 children per woman.
  - Life expectancy is 47 years on average (63 years in the rest of the world). AIDS is responsible for the fall of life expectancy in many African countries (in Botswana, life expectancy decreased from 65 years in 1990 to 35 years currently, the level of 1940)
  - Sub-Saharan Africa represents 10% of the world population.
  - 34 of the 39 poorest countries in the world are African.
  - The rate of illiteracy is 38%.

== Sports ==
- Supreme Council for Sport in Africa (CSSA): The 20th session of the general assembly of the Supreme Council for Sport in Africa (CSSA) in Algiers from 19 to 21 April adopted a new charter for the promotion of African sports, constituting a guide of reference for the African Union, in accordance with the "Maputo resolution" which advocates "the construction of a common policy aiming at putting physical education and sports at the service of sustainable development in Africa in general, and of the youth in particular." Different resolutions were adopted, inviting African States to start action programmes against doping and adhere to the declaration of Copenhagen; to set up "conditions favourable to an effective participation of women in sports activities, by introducing material conditions favorable to the development of female sports."

=== Association football ===
- The junior African Cup of Nations in Cotonou (Benin). 8 countries took part in it: Nigeria, Côte d'Ivoire, Mali, Benin (Group A), Egypt, Angola, Morocco, Lesotho (group B). On 26 January, Nigeria beat Morocco and Egypt beat Benin in the semi-finals. The finals took place on 29 January. It was marked by the victory of Nigeria over Egypt; Benin won the 3rd place, beating Morocco. The next junior African Cup of Nations will take place in the Republic of the Congo.
- Samuel Eto'o, Cameroonian attacker of FC Barcelona was elected Best African Football Player of 2004 by the Moroccan magazine Al-Mountakhab, following a poll among 21 African and European media.
- The tournament of the four member countries of the Union of West African Football Federations (UFOA) took place 21–27 February 2005 in Bamako. This competition, baptized "tournament of friendship" was won by Mali.
- The Confederation of African Football (CAF) gave the award of Best African Football Player of 2004 to Naïma Laouadi (Algeria).
- For the second year on row, the Ballon d'Or 2004 ("Golden Ball", the "African Footballer of the Year" award) was given to Cameroonian Samuel Eto'o by the Confederation of African Football (CAF) on 15 February 2005.
- The 6th edition of the Coupe d’Afrique des Nations des moins de 17 ans ("African Cup of Nations for under 17-year-olds") was held in Gambia from 6–21 May 2005. It was won by Gambia which beat Ghana in the finals on 22 May 2005.

=== Athletics ===
- The first Panafrican Meeting was held on 6 April in Bamako, Mali.
- Republic of Congo: The International Athletics Meet in Brazzaville, (French language: Meeting international d’athlétisme de Brazzaville), organised by the City Council of Brazzaville, was held on 8 May with the assistance of the African Confederation of Athletics. The event gathered athletes from about 30 African, European and Asian countries.

=== Basketball ===
- The 23rd African Basketball Championship was held in Algiers, Algeria. The Angolan team finally beat the Senegalese team in the finals on 24 August to become the champions.
- The 11th African Female Champion Clubs Basketball Cup (French language: Coupe d'Afrique des clubs champions féminins de basket) took place from 2–9 October in Bamako, Mali, and was won by Djoliba AC of Mali.
- The 20th African Male Champion Clubs Basketball Cup (French language: Coupe d'Afrique des clubs champions masculins de basket) took place from 26 November to 3 December in Abidjan.
- The 19th FIBA Africa Championship for Women basketball was won by Nigeria, beating the Senegal team in the final on 28 December.

=== Cycling ===
- The 3rd International Cyclists Tour of Cameroon (French language: Grand tour cycliste international du Cameroun), from 26 February to 12 March, with cyclists from twenty countries taking part.
- Burkina Faso: The First "Loop of Cotton" (French language: Boucle du coton) took place from 16 to 22 May with a 706.2 km course. 13 teams from Burkina Faso, Benin, Mali, Guinea, Niger and Togo competed. This race was organized as a homage to the African cotton producers.
- The 8th edition of the Tour du Senegal took place from 22 September to 2 October 2005. The course, 1234 kilometers long, consists of a prologue, 8 stages and a critérium and touches the towns of Rufisque, Kaolack, Thiadiaye, Diourbel, Somone, Thiès, Saint-Louis, Louga and Dakar. 17 teams of 6 cyclists from different African countries (Senegal, Angola, Morocco, Cameroon), from Europe (France, Italy, the Netherlands) and from Asia participated.
- Burkina Faso: The 19th Tour du Faso which was held between 26 October and 6 November 2005 was won by the burkinabé Jérémie Ouedraogo.

=== Fencing ===
- Abderrahmane Lamari of Algeria was re-elected as the president of the African Fencing Confederation during the meeting of September 2005 in Dakar.

=== Handball ===
- 19th World Handball Championship for men is held from 26 January to 6 February in Tunisia. President Zine El Abidine Ben Ali launches the tournament at Radès.

=== Rugby ===
- The "Super 16 Trophy", an international rugby tournament, took place from 31 May to 5 June in Ouagadougou, with teams from Benin, Burkina Faso, Mali, Niger and Togo.

=== Wrestling ===
- From 18 to 25 April, the Democratic Republic of the Congo organized the first Central African championship of associated wrestling styles, with participants from Cameroon, the Central African Republic, the Republic of the Congo, the Democratic Republic of the Congo and Chad.
- The 6th Greco-Roman wrestling championship of Africa was held on 30 April and 1 May in Ouagadougou (Burkina Faso)

=== Table tennis ===
- In Brazzaville on 26 January, Egypt won the finals of the African championship of male and female champion clubs.

=== By country ===
- Kenya: Ochilo Ayacko, minister for sports, announces that Kenya wishes to present its candidature for the organization of the Olympic Games of 2016.
- Senegal: the athlete Ne Ndoye (African long jump champion) on 19 January 2005 received the Lion d'Or ("Golden Lion") which rewards the best Senegalese sportsman of the year.

== Culture ==
=== Literature ===
- Rwanda: The first novel on the Tutsi genocide written by a Rwandan, Le Feu sous la soutane ("The Fire Under The Cassock", Editions L'Esprit Frappeur), by Benjamin Sehene, was published on 1 June 2005.
- Mali: the fifth edition of the Etonnants Voyageurs festival ("Astonishing travellers"), led by Moussa Konaté and Michel Le Bris took place from 7 to 13 February 2005 in Mali, in the capital Bamako and several other cities of the country (Gao, Kidal, Koulikoro, Ségou, Timbuktu, Kayes, Kita, Sikasso, Mopti). Part of the manifestation are literary workshops, literary cafés and meetings on various topics: "Culture and commerce: defending cultural diversity" or "Literature and development: new perspectives". Several writers are invited: Kangni Alem (Togo), Florent Koua-Zotti (Benin), Abdourahman Waberi (Djibouti), Abdelkader Djemai (Algeria), Alpha Mandé Diarra (Mali) and Abdoulaye Ascofaré (Mali). In parallel, the second edition of Etonnants Scénarios ("Astonishing scenarios") was held in Bamako, welcoming professionals of the African cinema.
- Senegal: The Goethe Institute of Senegal organized on 9 and 10 April a colloquium on the oeuvre of the Senegalese writer Aminata Sow Fall, entitled Une femme de lettres africaine de dimension internationale ("An African female writer of international importance").
- Angola: John Bella, Angolan writer, member of the board of directors of the Brigade Jeune de Littérature Angolaise ("Young Brigade of Angolan Literature", BJLA) proposed on 11 April to create an award for youth literature, to incite writers to write for children, developing in this fashion the taste for reading in children.
- The Prix Ahmadou-Kourouma 2005 (named after the Côte d'Ivoire writer, deceased in 2003) was awarded on 28 April to Tanella Boni of Côte d'Ivoire for his novel Matins de couvre-feu ("Curfew Mornings", Editions du Serpent à plumes).
- The Prix Sony Labou Tansi 2005 for French-speaking theatre, awarded at the Festival des francophonies in Limousin, was granted to Mali writer Moussa Konaté.
- Alain Mabanckou, Congolese writer, received the Prix des cinq continents de la francophonie, awarded by the Agence de la francophonie, for his novel Verre cassé ("Broken Glass").

=== Film ===
- Tunisia: The fourth edition of the Festival international du film de l'environnement ("International Festival of Environmental Film") in Kairouan (Tunisia) ended Saturday 12 February with the award ceremony. Tortues de mer, le dernier cri d'alarme ("Sea turtle, the last cry for help") by the Lebanese director Mohamed Sarfi received the Tapis d'or.
- Mali: 3rd edition of the Cinematographic Meetings of Bamako on 24 and 25 February 2005, organized by the Union des créateurs et entrepreneurs du cinéma et de l'audiovisuel de l'Afrique de l'Ouest ("Union of Western African film and audiovisual creators and producers", UCECAO). Souleymane Cissé, Malian director and president of the UCECAO declared that "these meetings must be a place for exchanging and sharing experiences on the problems of African cinema, and an occasion for the actors to think about an economically viable West African cinema". This edition was placed under a sign of solidarity with the war victim children of Darfour.
- Burkina Faso: the 19th edition of the Panafrican Film and Television Festival of Ouagadougou took place 26 February to 5 March 2005 in the Burkina Faso capital. The Étalon d'or de Yennenga (Grand prix of feature film) was won by Drum by Zola Maseko (South Africa).
- The 19th edition of the Fribourg International Film Festival (Fribourg, Switzerland) closed on 13 March 2005. The "Regard d'Or" went to the French-Burkinabé film la Nuit de la vérité ("The Night of the Truth") by Fanta Régina Nacro. The Special Jury Award was handed to the Belgo-Moroccan film l'Enfant endormi ("The Sleaping Child") by Yasmine Kassari.
- The 9th edition of the Écrans noirs festival ("Black Screens") was held in Yaoundé and Douala in Cameroon from 4 to 12 June 2005.

=== Music ===
- Senegal: Death on 13 February 2005 of Ndiaga Mbaye (songwriter, performer and well known griot) in Dakar.
- Music: The 47th Grammy Awards were held in Los Angeles (United States) on 13 February 2005. Senegalese singer Youssou N'Dour received a Grammy for his album Égypte in the category Best Contemporary World Music Album. The South African band Ladysmith Black Mambazo was awarded for its album Raise Your Spirit Higher in the category Best Traditional World Music Album.
- At the Victoires de la musique 2005 (Paris, 5 March 2005), Malian singers Amadou & Mariam were rewarded in the category Reggae/Ragga/World Album of the Year for their album Dimanche à Bamako ("Sunday in Bamako").
- Burkina Faso: Bil Aka Kora received the Kundé d’or on 29 April. It was the second time this Burkinabé artist won this prestigious Burkinabé musical award.

=== Photography ===
- Cameroon: 1st biennial of Photography and Visual Arts, in Douala, Cameroon from 14 to 23 January 2005. Fourteen photographers and seventeen painters (African, Afro-Caribbean and European) expose their works on the topic "Traces and Memory".
- Mali: the 6th African Photography Encounters were held from 10 to 17 November 2005 in Bamako. 37 photographers of 17 African countries expose their photographs around the topic "Another world".

=== Festivals and other cultural aspects ===
- Mali: 5th edition of the Festival of the desert in Essakane from 7–9 January 2005.
- Mali: 5th edition of the Tamadacht festival from 18 to 20 January in the Azawagh valley. Organized by the commune of Andéramboukane to promote the Tuareg culture, this festival brings together Malians and Nigerians.
- Cameroon: The fifth edition of the jazz and blues festival Jazz sans frontière ("Jazz without borders") was held in Yaoundé from 21 to 24 February 2005. Among the performers were Etienne Mbappé and Kayou Jazz and Roots Project.
- Morocco: The second edition of the Festival national du théâtre des jeunes ("National Festival for Youth Theatre") was held in Rabat from 2–9 April, with the participation of 300 young people of 120 theatrical societies from all over the country.
- Tunisia: The 4th edition of the Festival méditerranéen du théâtre d'enfants ("Mediterranean Festival of children's theatre") was organized in Ben Arous from 19 to 26 March 2005 with the participation of Algeria, Morocco, Spain, France, Italy, Turkey, Egypt, and the Netherlands (honorary visitor).
- Mali: the 9th edition of the Festival des Masques et Marionnettes de Markala ("Markala Masks and Marionnettes Festival", FESMAMA) was held from 4–6 March 2005 in Markala, rural village in the Ségou region with companies from various areas of Mali, France and West Africa.
- Mauritania: The second Festival des musiques nomades ("Festival of Nomadic Music") of Nouakchott was held in the Mauritanian capital 4–8 April 2005 with among others Aïcha Mint Chighaly (Mauritania) and of Baaba Maal (Senegal).
- Democratic Republic of the Congo: the fifth edition of the Panafrican Music Festival (Fespam) was held from 9–16 July, Brazzaville, Pointe-Noire and Kinshasa.
- Mali: Ali Farka Touré, musician and mayor of the town of Niafunké, in April 2005 created a foundation bearing his name. This foundation intends to organize a biannual jazz festival in Niafunké and to create a training center for young artists playing local traditional instruments.
- Mali: The cultural cooperative Jamana (created by Alpha Oumar Konaré) on 13 April launched an Internet site with information in Bamanankan, in partnership with UNESCO.
- Mali: The Festival dansa/diawoura took place in Bafoulabé from 8 10 April 2005.
- Mali: the second edition of the West African Hunters Festival took place from 27 to 29 May in several cities of Mali (Bamako, Ségou, Sikasso and Yanfolila) and brought together hunters from Mali, Burkina Faso, Senegal, Gambia, Guinea, and Niger.
- Senegal: 13th International Jazz Festival of Saint-Louis from 4 to 7 May 2005, with among others Florin Niculescu, Richard Bona, Philip Catherine and Alexander Monty.
- Cameroon: 4th edition of the Festival international de voix de femmes ("International Festival for women voices, MASSAO 2005) in Douala from 29 April to 7 May. Werewere Liking, Cameroonian multidisciplinary artist (music, theatre, literature, painting, dance) was rewarded with the Massao d'honneur ("Honorary Massao").
- Mali: A conference on "multilingualism for cultural diversity and for the participation of all in cyberspace" took place in Bamako (Mali) on 6 and 7 May in the presence of Koïchiro Matsuura, director general of UNESCO.
- Senegal: 3rd edition of the International Theatre Festival for peace (Fest'art) in Dakar in May 2005.
- Morocco: Festival of the Sacred Musics of the World from 3 to 11 June in Fez.
- Morocco: Essaouira Gnaoua and World Music Festival from 23 to 26 June.
- Congo: The fifth edition of the Panafrican Music Festival (Fespam) was held from 9 to 16 July in Brazzaville.
- Mali: The third edition of the "Dense Bamako Danse" festival opened on 11 November 2005 in the Malian capital. This festival of contemporary dance, organized by association Donko Seko, brought together companies from South Africa, Burkina Faso, Cameroon, Côte d'Ivoire, Mali, Mozambique, Senegal and Chad.

== Sciences ==
- Ethiopia: A team of archaeologists led by Sileshi Semaw announced in Nature journal that they had discovered the bones of a hominid, Ardipithecus ramidus, dating back 4.5 million years at an excavation site at Gona in the Afar Region.
- Madagascar: American zoologists led by geneticist Edward Louis announced on 14 January the discovery of two new species of Lemuridae.

== Economy ==
- Economic growth: Omar Kabbaj, president of the African Development Bank (AfDB), announced that the economic growth 2004 for the African continent has been exceptional, with a growth rate of 4.5% (4.1% in 2003). Central Africa knew a growth rate of 8.7%, Eastern Africa 6.5%, North Africa 4.7% and Western Africa 4%. The AfDB president however regretted that "the continent continually has to deal with major challenges, like conflicts, the strong incidence of poverty and an inexorable progression of the AIDS pandemia."
- Aeronautics: The Economic and Monetary Community of Central Africa (Cemac) and the airline Royal Air Maroc on 24 February 2005 signed a draft agreement for the establishment of the regional airline Air Cémac.
- Western Africa: The BCEAO (Banque Centrale des États de l'Afrique de l'Ouest, "Central Bank of the States of Western Africa") affirmed on 22 February to have recovered 99.21% of the franc CFA notes of the 1992 range, at the end of a demonetisation operation which was completed on 18 February.
- Aeronautics/Mali: The first stone of the Institut africain des métiers de l'aérien ("African Institute of Aeronautic Skills") was cast on 17 March 2005 at the Bamako-Sénou airport site. This new school was initiated by the airline Air France.

=== Agriculture ===
- The countries of the G8 and the NEPAD ("New Partnership for Africa's Development") on 28 January in Dar Es Salaam announced actions for the development of agriculture in Eastern and Central Africa. Focus is on seeds, pesticides, the food trade, and on monitoring, warning and evaluation mechanisms for food safety.
- On 4 and 5 February, on invitation by the Senegalese president Abdoulaye Wade, an international forum on "The global agricultural divide" was held in Dakar (Senegal) in the presence of several Heads of State: Amadou Toumani Touré (Mali), Jacques Chirac (France), Blaise Compaoré (Burkina Faso), Olusegun Obasanjo (Nigeria), Maaouiya Ould Taya (Mauritania), Tandja Mamadou (Niger). It brought together politicians, scientists, representatives of the civil society and agroalimentary companies around "views on developing agricultural territories". Rural organizations from Europe, Asia, Africa and North America met on an invitation by the Réseau des organisations paysannes et des producteurs de l'Afrique de l'Ouest ("Network of Rural Organizations and Producers of Western Africa", ROPPA) and the Conseil national de concertation et de coopération des ruraux ("National Council for Rural Dialogue and Co-operation", CNCR), to convey their claims: the right to food sovereignty for each country, the end of dumping practices and of disguised subsidies, and consideration for peasants' interests in negotiations of international treaties like those of the World Trade Organization.
- GMO: The West African peasants, organized in the Réseau des organisations paysannes et des producteurs de l'Afrique de l'Ouest ("Network of Rural Organizations and Producers of Western Africa", ROPPA) and the Réseau des chambres d’agriculture de l’Afrique de l’ouest ("Network of West African Chambers of Agriculture", RECAO), meeting in Bamako (Mali) on 21 June, opposed against genetically modified organisms (GMOs).

=== Cotton ===
- Meeting in Bamako on 14 January 2005 of representatives of five Sub-Saharan cotton producing countries (Mali, Benin, Burkina Faso, Senegal and Chad) that insist on the need for developed countries to reduce subsidies to their own farmers. "Just for the cotton season 2004-2005, Central and Western Africa are estimated to have a deficit of more than 220 billion FCFA, or more than 400 million dollars, worsening poverty by destroying development efforts", they declared in a common statement.
- On a meeting in Ouagadougou (Burkina Faso) on 12 March 2005 in the margin of the 3rd days of the African Cotton Association (ACA), the Ministers for Agriculture of Benin, Burkina Faso, Mali and Chad launched an appeal to African governments and the international community for the installation of a rescue fund for the African cotton producers. They also request a time frame for the United States and the European Union to reduce and totally abandon subsidies to European and American cotton producers. The competition of American and European subsidized cotton means a "loss of earnings" of 200 billion CFA francs (more than 300 million euros) for African cotton producers.

=== Debt ===
- On 17 January, while opening a meeting of 18 African Finance Ministers, Gordon Brown, British Chancellor of the Exchequer (Minister for Finance), wished the cancellation of the "unpayable" debt of African countries and presented the outline of an action plan against poverty in Africa which received the support of former South-African president Nelson Mandela.

== See also ==
- List of state leaders in 2005 § Africa

== Notes ==
This text was translated from the original French-language article.
