= Korean African =

Korean African or African Korean may refer to:

- Afro-Asians, people of mixed African and Asian (including Korean) descent
- Koreans in Africa
- Africans in North Korea
- Africans in South Korea
