= 1960 in Africa =

Africa-related events during the year of 1960

Known as the Year of Africa, 1960 saw 17 African countries declare independence, including 14 colonies from the French colonial empire, 2 from the British Empire and 1 from Belgium.

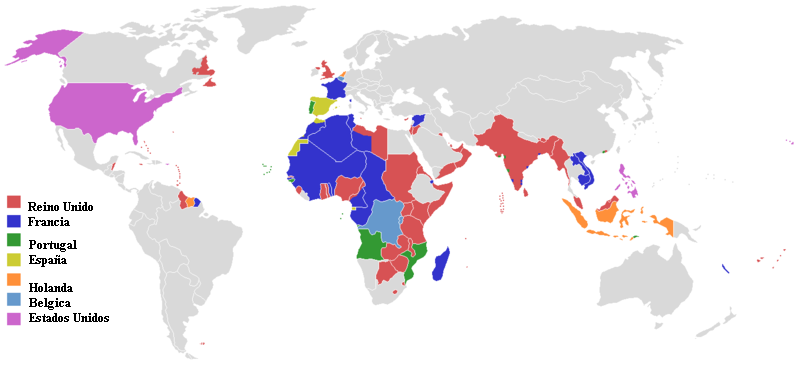
Colonial powers in 1945

== January ==
- Mau Mau Uprising is officially over in Kenya.
- 9–11 January – Aswan High Dam construction begins in Egypt.
- 21 January – A mine collapses at Coalbrook, South Africa, killing 437.
- 24 January – A major insurrection occurs in Algiers against French colonial policy.

== February ==
- 3 February – Harold Macmillan's Wind of Change speech is made in Cape Town, South Africa. It signalled the end of the British Empire.
- 10 February – A conference about the independence of the Belgian Congo begins in Brussels.
- 29 February–1 March – The 5.7 M_{w} Agadir earthquake shakes coastal Morocco with a maximum perceived intensity of X (Extreme), destroying Agadir, and leaving 12,000 dead and another 12,000 injured.

== March ==
- 21 March – The Sharpeville massacre in South Africa kills more than 69 people, wounds 300.

== April ==
- 16 April – Gunman David Pratt attacks South African Prime Minister Henrik Verwoerd in Johannesburg, wounding him seriously.
- 27 April – Togo declares independence with Sylvanus Olympio.

== May ==
- 14 May – The Kenya African Democratic Union Party is founded in Kenya, when 3 political parties join forces.

== June ==
- 20 June – The Mali Federation declares independence with Modibo Keita as leader and Dakar as capital.
- 26 June – Madagascar declares independence with Philibert Tsiranana as President.
- 26 June – Somaliland declares independence with Mohamed Haji Ibrahim Egal as President and Hargeisa as capital.
- 30 June – Republic of the Congo (Léopoldville) (now Democratic Republic of the Congo) declares independence with Joseph Kasa-Vubu as President.

== July ==
- 1 July – Somalia declares independence, with Aden Abdullah Osman Daar as President.
- 1 July – Ghana becomes a Republic and Kwame Nkrumah becomes its first President as Elizabeth II of the United Kingdom ceases to be the Head of state.
- 11 July- Moise Tshombe declares the Congolese province of Katanga independent; he receives Belgian help.

== August ==
- 1 August – Dahomey (now Benin) declares independence, with Hubert Maga as President.
- 3 August – Niger declares independence, with Hamani Diori as President.
- 5 August – Upper Volta (now Burkina Faso) declares independence, with Maurice Yaméogo as President.
- 6 August – In the Republic of the Congo (Leopoldville), Albert Kalonji declares the independence of the Autonomous State of South Kasai.
- 7 August – Côte d'Ivoire declares independence, with Félix Houphouët-Boigny as President.
- 11 August – Chad declares independence, with François Tombalbaye as President.
- 13 August – Central African Republic declares independence, with David Dacko as President.
- 15 August – Republic of the Congo (Brazzaville) declares independence, with Fulbert Youlou as President.
- 17 August – Gabon declares independence, with Léon M'ba as President.
- 20 August – Senegal leaves the Mali Federation, creating Senegal.

== September ==
- 5 September – Congo president Joseph Kasavubu fires Patrice Lumumba's government and places him under house arrest.
- 14 September – Colonel Joseph Mobutu takes power in Congo (Leopoldville) in a military coup.
- 20 September – Dahomey, Upper Volta, Cameroon, Central African Republic, Chad, Republic of the Congo (Leopoldville), Republic of the Congo (Brazzaville), Côte d'Ivoire, Gabon, Madagascar, Niger, Somalia, Togo, Mali and Senegal obtain membership in the United Nations.
- 22 September – Mali declares independence from the Mali federation.

== October ==
- 1 October – Nigeria declares independence, with Nnamdi Azikiwe as President.
- 5 October – White South Africans vote to make the country a republic.
- 7 October – Nigeria obtains membership in the United Nations.

== November ==
- 28 November – Mauritania declares independence, with Moktar Ould Daddah as President.

== December ==
- 9 December – French President Charles de Gaulle's visit to Algeria is marked by bloody riots by European and Muslim mobs in Algeria's largest cities, killing 127 people.
- 13 December – While Emperor Haile Selassie I of Ethiopia visits Brazil, his Imperial Bodyguard revolts unsuccessfully against his rule. The rebels proclaim the emperor's son, Crown Prince Asfa Wossen, as Emperor.
- 14 December – Antoine Gizenga proclaims in Stanleyville, Congo, that he has assumed the premiership.
- 17 December – Troops loyal to Haile Selassie I in Ethiopia suppress the revolt that began 13 December, giving power back to their leader upon his return from Brazil. Haile Selassie absolves his son of any guilt.

== Continental population in 1960 ==
- Africa: 277,398,000

== Births ==
- 4 March – John Mugabi, Ugandan boxer and world Junior Middleweight champion
