= Rally for the Support of Democracy and Development =

Political party in Togo

The Rally for the Support of Democracy and Development (French: Rassemblement pour le soutien de la démocratie et du développement) is a political party in Togo. Its national president is Harry Olympio.

In the parliamentary election held on 27 October 2002, the RSDD won 3 out of 81 seats. The party led the first protests against the succession of President Gnassingbé Eyadéma by his son Faure Gnassingbé in February 2005. It supported Harry Olympio in the presidential election of 24 April 2005, but he withdrew shortly before the election; he nevertheless won 0.55% of the vote.
