= Early history of South Africa =

South African history

The Prehistory of South Africa (and, inseparably, the wider region of Southern Africa) lasts from the Middle Stone Age until the 17th century. Southern Africa was first reached by Homo sapiens before 130,000 years ago, possibly before 260,000 years ago. The region remained in the Late Stone Age until the first traces of pastoralism were introduced about 2,000 years ago. The Bantu migration reached the area now South Africa around the first decade of the 3rd century, over 1800 years ago. Early Bantu kingdoms were established in the 11th century. First European contact dates to 1488, but European colonization began in the 17th century (see History of South Africa (1652–1815)).

== Middle Stone Age ==
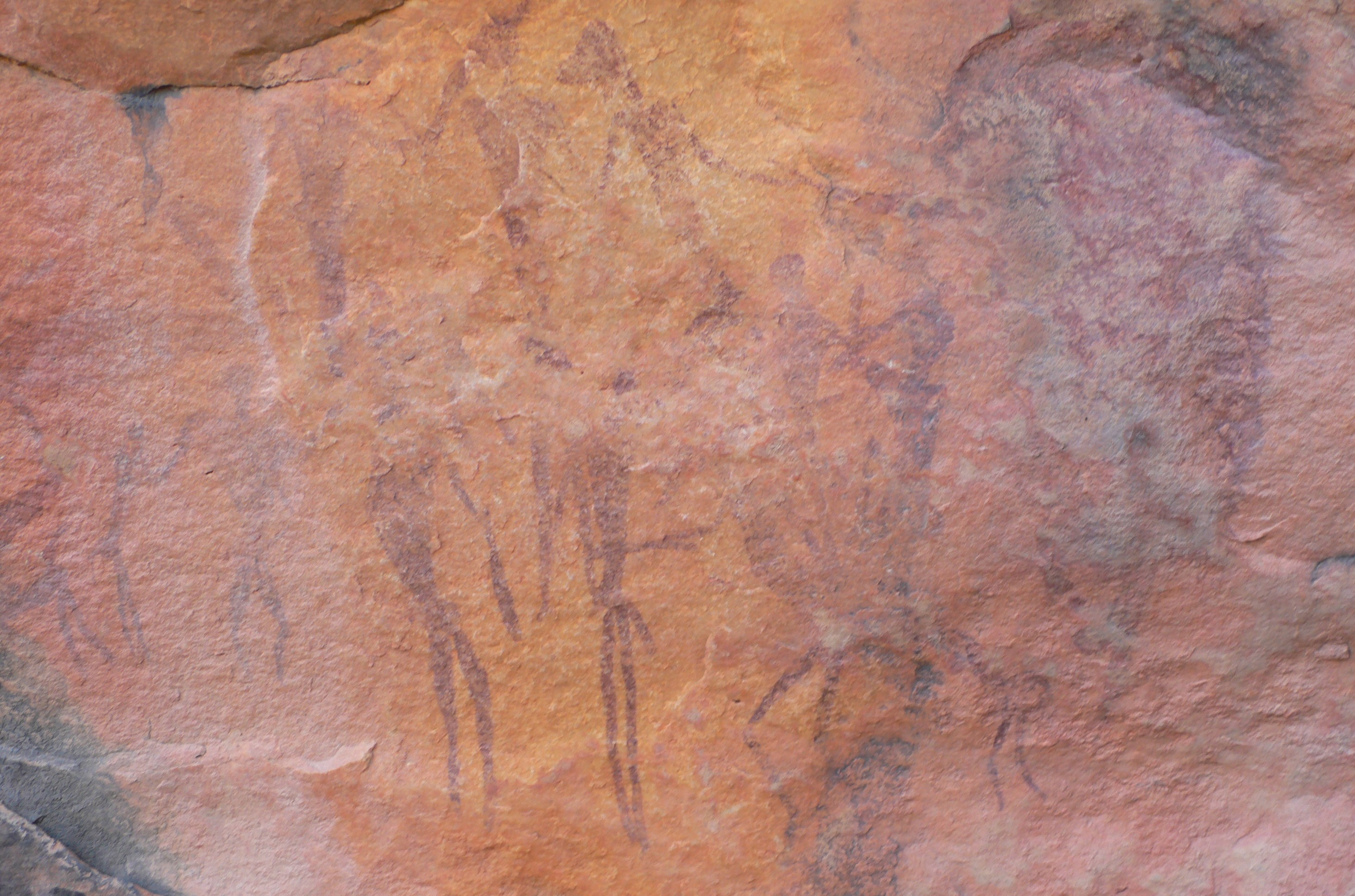
Rock paintings from the Western Cape

The Middle Stone Age covers the period from 300,000 to 50,000 years ago. The hunter-gatherers of Southern Africa, named San by their pastoral neighbours, the Khoikhoi, and Bushmen by Europeans, are in all likelihood direct descendants of the first anatomically modern humans to migrate to Southern Africa more than 130,000 years ago. The term Khoisan groups the pre-Bantu populations of South Africa. It entered usage in the early-to-mid 20th century, and was originally coined by Isaac Schapera around 1930. It entered wider usage from the 1960s, based on the proposal of a "Khoisan" language family by Joseph Greenberg. The name San in anthropological usage is a back-formation from the compound and began to replace "Bushmen" from the 1970s onward (see San people#Names). The term has gradually replaced the former term Cape Blacks or Western Cape Blacks, from which is derived the term Capoid used in 20th-century anthropological literature. Use of Khoisanid in genetic genealogy was introduced by Cavalli-Sforza, L. Luca et al., The History and Geography of Human Genes (1994).

It is thought that the Homo sapiens populations ancestral to the Khoisan of Southern Africa have represented the largest human population during the majority of the anatomically modern human timeline, from their early separation before 150 kya until the recent peopling of Eurasia some 70 kya. They were much more widespread than today, their modern habitat being reduced due to their decimation in the course of the Bantu expansion. They were dispersed throughout much of Southern and Southeastern Africa. There was also a significant back-migration of bearers of the mitochondrial DNA haplogroup L0 towards eastern Africa between 120 and 75 kya. Rito et al. (2013) speculate that pressure from such back-migration may even have contributed to the dispersal of East African populations out of Africa at about 70 kya. During the Middle Stone Age, the climate fluctuated between glacial, rainy, and increasingly humid causing the early hunter-gatherers of South Africa to adapt their technological advancements, movements, and foraging strategies.

Blombos Cave contains personal ornaments and what are presumed to be the tools used for the production of artistic imagery, as well as bone tools. Still Bay and Howieson's Poort contain variable tool technologies.

The Khoisanid populations ancestral to the Khoisan were spread throughout much of Southern and Eastern Africa throughout the Late Stone Age, after about 75,000 years ago. A further expansion, dated to about 20,000 years ago, has been proposed based on the distribution of the L0d haplogroup. Rito et al. suggest a connection of this recent expansion with the spread of click consonants to eastern African languages (Hadza language). The Middle Stone Age Sangoan industry occupied southern Africa in areas where annual rainfall is less than a metre (1000 mm; 39.4 in). The contemporary San and Khoi peoples resemble those represented by the ancient Sangoan skeletal remains.

== Late Stone Age ==
The Late Stone Age in South Africa corresponds to the later phase of the Sangoan, beginning about 50,000 years ago, followed by Lupemban culture, from about 30,000 to 12,000 years ago (also known as "Second Intermediate", between Middle and Late Stone Age. The term Late Stone Age was introduced for South Africa in 1929 by John Hilary Goodwin and C. van Riet Lowe The Lupemban is followed by the so-called Albany industry (12,000 to 9,000 years ago). Finally, the time from 9,000 to 2,000 years ago (7th to 1st millennia BC) is accounted for by the so-called "Wilton inventory" microliths.

Beginning around 2,000 years ago, there are traces of pastoralism. This reflects the arrival of the Khoikhoi herders; from this time, hunting and gathering gradually gave way to herding as the dominant economic activity. The arrival of livestock is thought to have introduced concepts of personal wealth and property-ownership as well as the establishment of a political structure of chiefdoms.

== Bantu expansion and aftermath ==
It was long believed at around the middle of the 1st millennium, the Bantu expansion reached Southern Africa from the Niger River Delta, but recent archaeological work places the presence of Bantu-speakers in the region as early as the 3rd century CE. The Bantu-speakers not only had domestic animals, but also practiced agriculture, farming millet, sorghum and other crops. They also displayed skill in working iron, and lived in settled villages. The Bantu arrived in South Africa in small waves rather than in one cohesive migration. Some groups, ancestral to the Nguni peoples (the Zulu, Xhosa, Swazi, and Ndebele), preferred to live near the coast. Others, now known as the Sotho–Tswana peoples (Tswana, Pedi, and Basotho), settled in the Highveld, while today's Venda, Lemba, and Tsonga peoples made their homes in the northeastern areas of South Africa.

Bantu-speakers and Khoisan mixed, as evidenced by rock paintings showing the two different groups interacting. The type of contact remains unknown, although linguistic proof of integration survives to prove interaction was well established, as several Bantu languages (notably Xhosa and Zulu) incorporated the click consonant characteristic of the Khoisan languages.

The Khoikhoi began to move further south, reaching the Cape. Along the way they intermarried with the hunter-gatherers, whom they referred to as San (in origin a derogatory term based on a term for "picking up from the ground", i.e. "gathering, scavenging"). It is thought that the San themselves were pushed back by both the advancing Bantu and by the Khoikhoi, retreating to the interior of the Kalahari.

The Bantu expansion was one of the major demographic movements in human prehistory, sweeping much of the African continent during the 2nd and 1st millennia BC. Bantu-speaking communities reached southern Africa from the Congo Basin by the early centuries AD. Some of the migrant groups, ancestral to today's Nguni peoples (the Zulu, Xhosa, Swazi, and Ndebele), preferred to live near the eastern coast of what is present-day South Africa. Others, now known as the Sotho–Tswana peoples (Tswana, Pedi, and Sotho), settled in the interior on the plateau known as the Highveld while today's Venda, Lemba, and Tsonga peoples made their homes in the north-eastern areas of present-day South Africa.

The Kingdom of Mapungubwe, which was located near the northern border of present-day South Africa, at the confluence of the Limpopo and Shashe rivers adjacent to present-day Zimbabwe and Botswana, was the first Bantu kingdom in southern Africa, established in the 11th century. The kingdom was the first stage in a development that would culminate in the creation of the Kingdom of Zimbabwe in the 13th century, and with gold trading links to Rhapta and Kilwa Kisiwani on the African east coast. The Kingdom of Mapungubwe lasted about 80 years, and at its height its population was about 5,000 people.

The first European historical records about these people begin in the late 15th century, with the beginning of European exploration. The first European historical record of South Africa dates to 1488, by Portuguese explorer Bartolomeu Dias. In November 1497, a fleet of Portuguese ships under the command of the Portuguese mariner Vasco da Gama rounded the Cape of Good Hope. European historical records of the interior begin significantly later, with the foundation of the Dutch Cape Colony in 1652.

== See also ==
- History of Southern Africa
