= Alpha Mandé Diarra =

Malian author

Alpha Mande Diarra
- Born: 1954 (age 71–72); Bamako, Mali
- Education: Ecole Nationale Vétérinaire d'Alfort
- Occupation: Author

Alpha Mande Diarra is a Malian author, born in 1954. He studied veterinary medicine in France at the Ecole Nationale Vétérinaire d'Alfort. (National Veterinary School at Alfort in Maisons-Alfort, Val-de-Marne, France) He is a practicing veterinarian at Bamako and Fara in his native Mali.

== Bibliography ==
- 1981 Sahel, sanglante sécheresse - Présence Africaine (ISBN 2708703897)
- 1994 La Nièce de l'Imam - Editions Sepia (ISBN 2907888536)
- 1999 Rapt à Bamako (with Marie-Florence Ehret) - Editions Le Figuier/EDICEF (ISBN 2841296458)
