= Coalbrook =

Village in County Tipperary, Ireland

Coalbrook Glaise an Ghuail
- Village
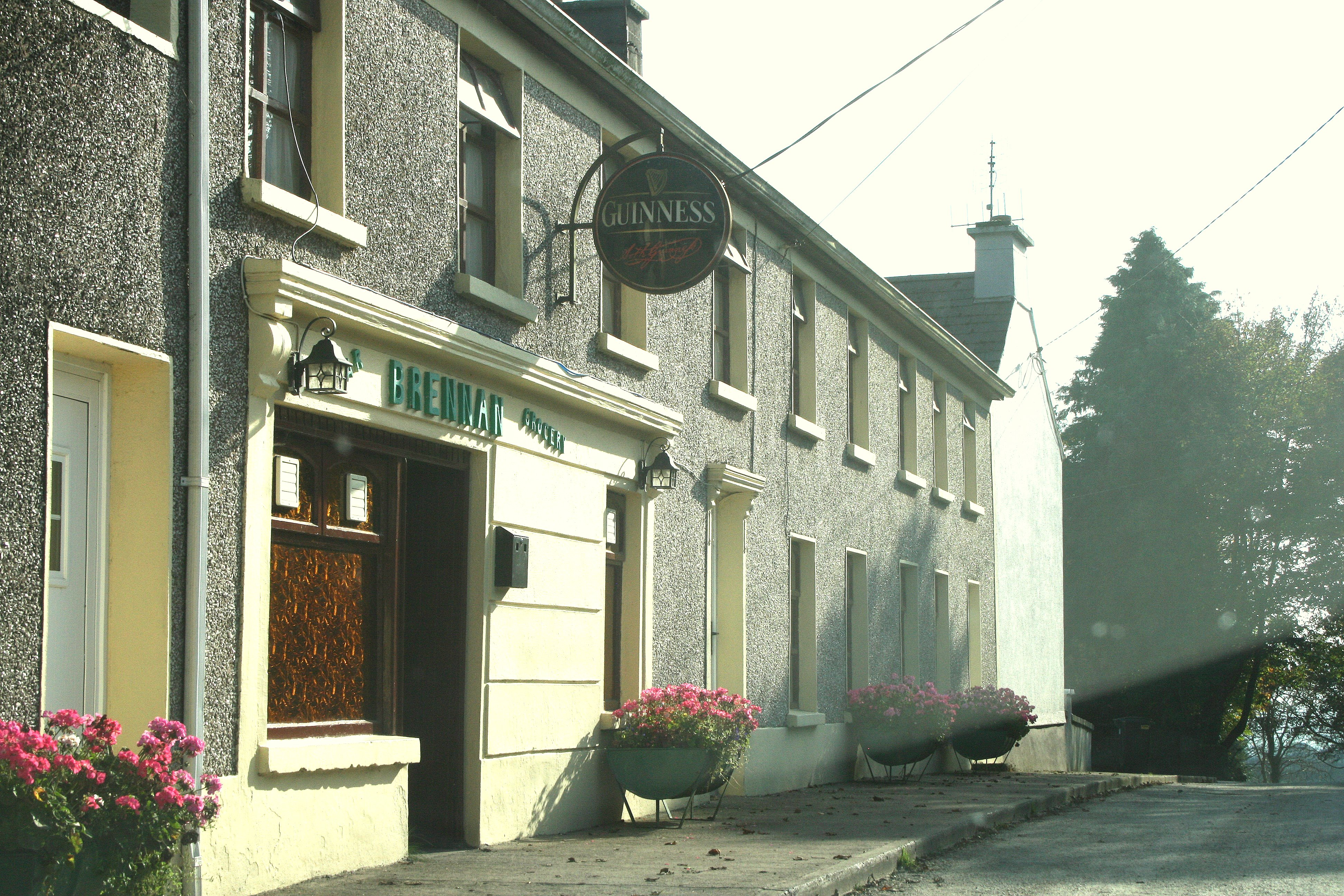
- Main Street

- Location in Ireland
- Coordinates: 52°36′41″N 7°34′48″W
- Country: Ireland
- Province: Munster
- County: County Tipperary
- Time zone: UTC+0 (WET)
  - Summer (DST): UTC-1 (IST (WEST))

Coalbrook (Irish: Glaise an Ghuail) is a village in the Slieveardagh Hills in County Tipperary, Ireland. It is just off the R690 road and is equidistant from Kilkenny, Cashel and Thurles, about 25 km (16 mi) from all three.

Lisnamrock National School educates the children of Coalbrook and the surrounding townlands.

== Gallery ==
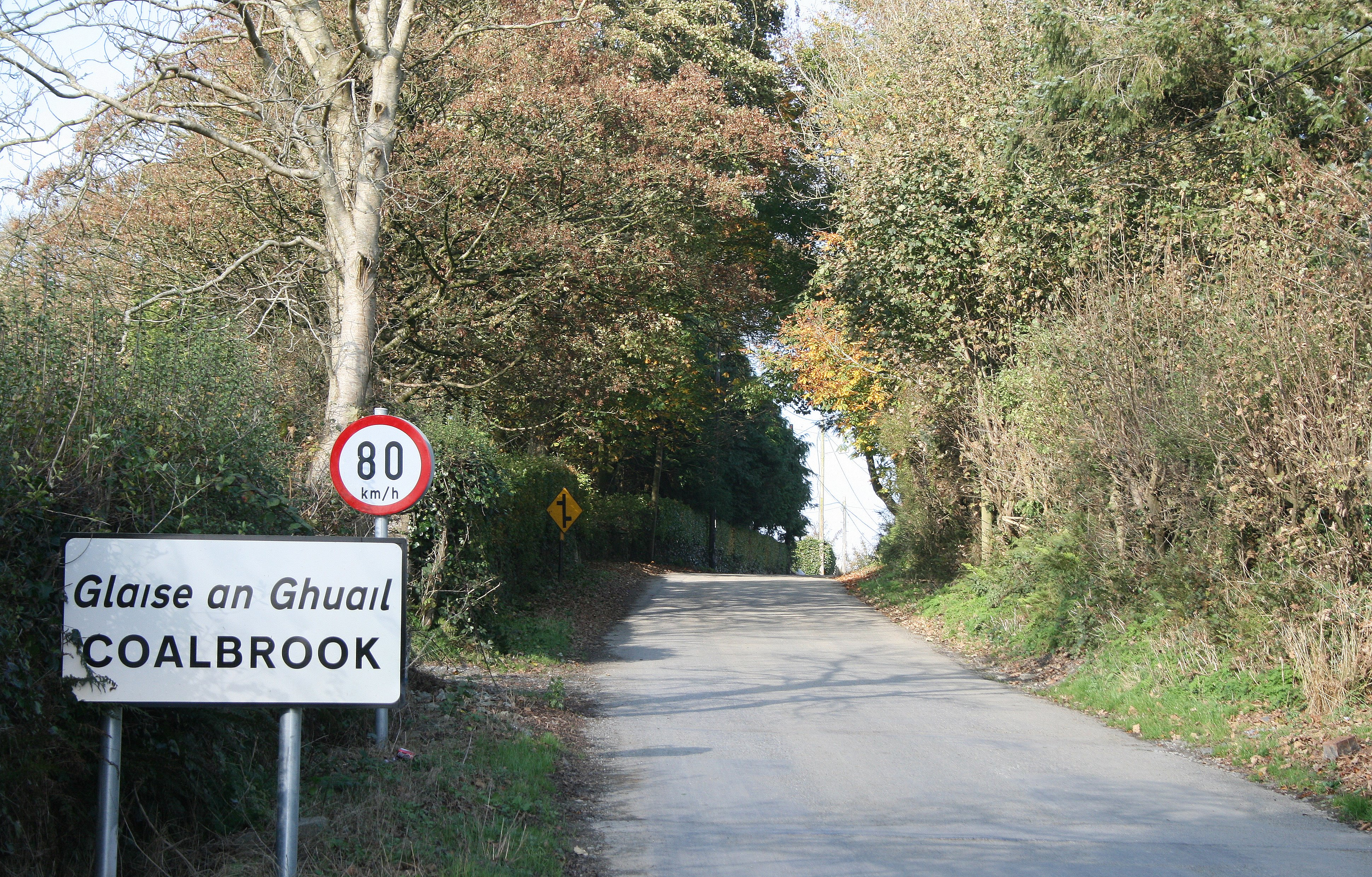
Coalbrook

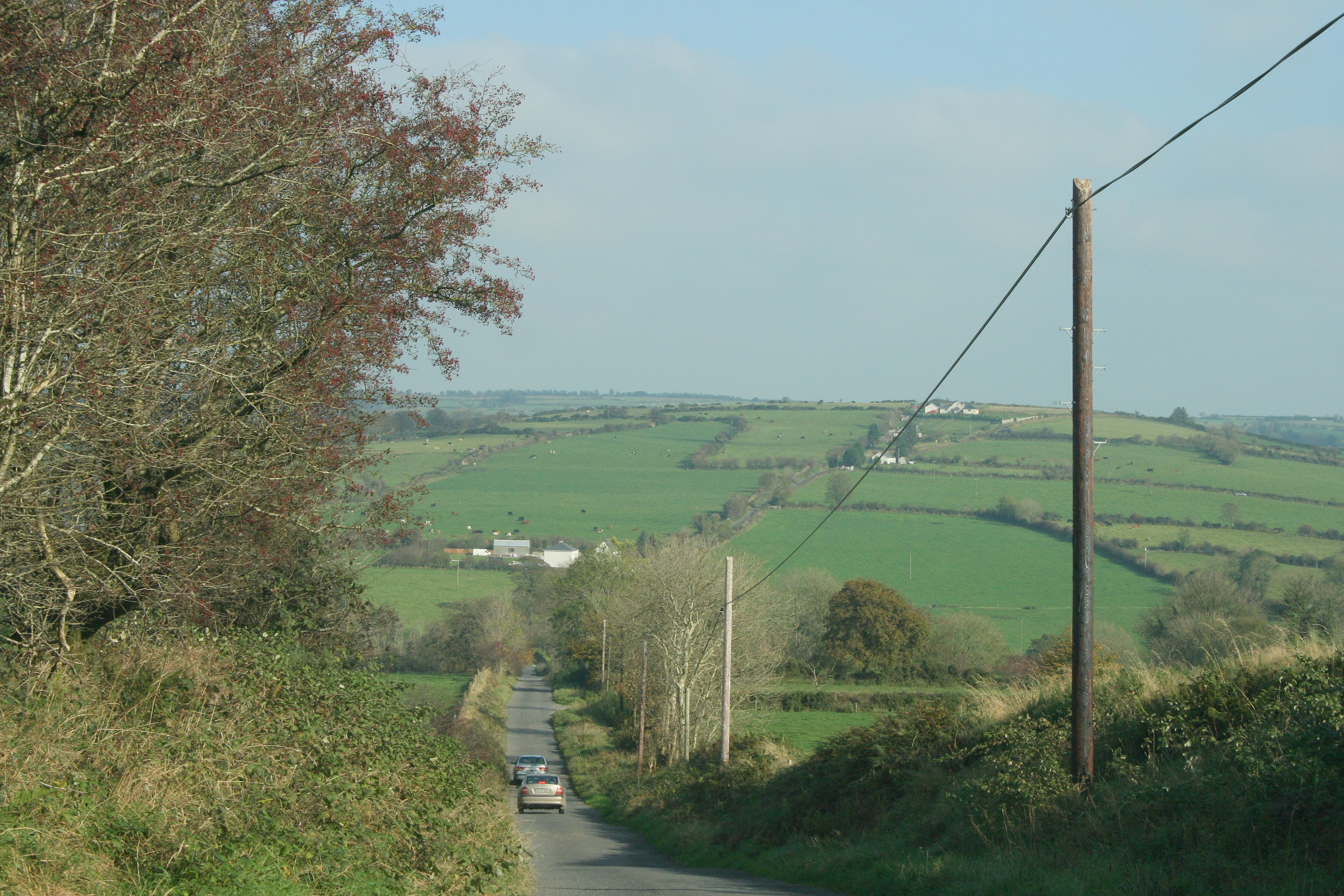
Looking east; the R690 at the bottom of the hill

== See also ==
- List of towns and villages in the Republic of Ireland
