= Harry Olympio =

Togolese politician

Harry Octavianus Olympio is a Togolese politician and the National President of the Rally for the Support of Democracy and Development (RSDD).

== First period in government, 2000 attack dispute ==
Olympio, the cousin of Union of Forces for Change (UFC) President Gilchrist Olympio, was appointed Minister for the Promotion of Democracy and the Rule of Law in 1998; as a result of his acceptance of a position in the government, he was widely considered a traitor by the opposition. After Amnesty International released a report in May 1999 alleging that hundreds of opposition supporters had been killed in the wake of the controversial June 1998 presidential election, Olympio criticized the report as being "characterized by its frivolousness"; he said that an inquiry should be conducted under the auspices of the United Nations and the Organization of African Unity.

He was also the head of the Joint Follow-up Committee, involved in preparations for a planned parliamentary election, when on May 5, 2000 he was allegedly the victim of an attack near his office in Lomé. According to an official inquiry into this attack, he organized the attack on himself, assisted by his brother Antonio Olympio. Olympio denied this accusation, but on June 16, 2000 his dismissal as Minister for the Promotion of Democracy and the Rule of Law was announced. Some suspected that the attack was actually the work of the security forces.

== 2001 arrest ==
In 2001, Olympio was arrested and convicted in a "seriously flawed" trial for the production and possession of explosives. He was sentenced to 18 months in prison and fined $500 (360,000 CFA francs); however, President Gnassingbé Eyadéma pardoned him in 2001.

== 2002 parliamentary election, second period in government ==
The RSDD participated in the October 2002 parliamentary election, despite the opposition boycott of the election; Olympio said that "the leaders of the traditional opposition have run out of new ideas, and they must bow out". Olympio was again appointed to the government as Minister in charge of Relations with Parliament on December 3, 2002. He was kept in that position in the government named on July 29, 2003, but he promptly resigned on August 4, saying that he had already made clear to Prime Minister Koffi Sama, prior to the announcement of the new government, that he was unwilling to remain in his previous position and would only serve in the government if he was given "the opportunity to work for peace and national reconciliation". It was suggested that he had wanted the post of Minister of Justice, with combined responsibility for national reconciliation.

== 2005 presidential election ==
Following the death of President Eyadéma in February 2005, Olympio announced in mid-March that he would be a candidate in the April 2005 presidential election. Although the main opposition coalition united behind the candidacy of Emmanuel Bob-Akitani of the UFC, Olympio said that "the struggle for change is represented by dynamic, youthful leadership", not, in reference to Bob-Akitani's age, "the image of an old man who is not capable of running a hectic race". Olympio received 0.55% of the national vote according to official final results, placing fourth and last.

== 2006 bomb attack ==
In March 2006, Olympio was sought in connection with an alleged petrol bomb attack on police headquarters.
