= 2016 in Africa =

== Incumbents ==
- Algeria
  - President – Abdelaziz Bouteflika, President of Algeria (1999–2019)
  - Prime Minister – Abdelmalek Sellal, Prime Minister of Algeria (2014–2017)
- Angola
  - President – José Eduardo dos Santos, President of Angola (1979–2017)
- Benin
  - President –
    1. Thomas Boni Yayi, President of Benin (2006–2016)
    2. Patrice Talon, President of Benin (2016–present)
- Botswana
  - President – Ian Khama, President of Botswana (1998–2008)
- Burundi
  - President – Pierre Nkurunziza, President of Burundi (2005–2020)
- Cameroon
  - President – Paul Biya, President of Cameroon (1982–present)
  - Prime Minister – Philémon Yang, Prime Minister of Cameroon (2009–2019)
- Cape Verde
  - President – Jorge Carlos Fonseca, President of Cape Verde (2011–2021)
  - Prime Minister –
    1. Jose Maria Neves, Prime Minister of Cape Verde (2001–2016)
    2. Ulisses Correia e Silva, Prime Minister of Cape Verde (2016–present)
- Central African Republic
  - President –
    1. Catherine Samba-Panza, Transitional President of Central African Republic (2014–2016)
    2. Faustin-Archange Touadéra, Transitional President of Central African Republic (2016–present)
  - Prime Minister –
    1. Mahamat Kamoun, Prime Minister of Central African Republic (2014–2016)
    2. Simplice Sarandji, Prime Minister of Central African Republic (2016–2019)
- Chad
  - President – Idriss Déby, President of Chad (1990–2021)
  - Prime Minister –
    1. Kalzeubet Pahimi Deubet, Prime Minister of Chad (2013–2016)
    2. Albert Pahimi Padacké, Prime Minister of Chad (2016–2018)
- Comoros
  - President –
    1. Ikililou Dhoinine, President of Comoros (2011–2016)
    2. Azali Assoumani, President of Comoros (2016–2019)
- Republic of the Congo
  - President – Denis Sassou Nguesso, President of the Republic of the Congo (1997–present)
  - Prime Minister – Clément Mouamba, Prime Minister of the Republic of the Congo (2016–2021)
- Côte d'Ivoire
  - President – Alassane Ouattara, President of Côte d'Ivoire (2010–present)
  - Prime Minister – Daniel Kablan Duncan, Prime Minister of Côte d'Ivoire (2012–2017)
- Democratic Republic of the Congo
  - President – Joseph Kabila, President of the Democratic Republic of the Congo (2001–2019)
  - Prime Minister –
    1. Matata Ponyo Mapon, Prime Minister of the Democratic Republic of the Congo (2012–2016)
    2. Samy Badibanga, Prime Minister of the Democratic Republic of the Congo (2016–2017)
- Djibouti
  - President – Ismaïl Omar Guelleh, President of Djibouti (1999–present)
  - Prime Minister – Abdoulkader Kamil Mohamed, Prime Minister of Djibouti (2013–present)
- Egypt
  - President – Abdel Fattah el-Sisi, President of Egypt (2014–present)
  - Prime Minister – Sherif Ismail, Prime Minister of Egypt (2015–2018)
- Equatorial Guinea
  - President – Teodoro Obiang Nguema Mbasogo, President of Equatorial Guinea (1982–present)
  - Prime Minister –
    1. Ricardo Mangue Obama Nfubea, Prime Minister of Equatorial Guinea (2012–2016)
    2. Vicente Ehate Tomi, Prime Minister of Equatorial Guinea (2016–2023)
- Eritrea
  - President – Isaias Afwerki, President of Eritrea (1993–present)
- Ethiopia
  - President – Mulatu Teshome, President of Ethiopia (2013–2018)
  - Prime Minister – Hailemariam Desalegn, Prime Minister of Ethiopia (2012–2018)
- Gabon
  - President – Ali Bongo, President of Gabon (2009–2023)
  - Prime Minister –
    1. Daniel Ona Ondo, Prime Minister of Gabon (2014–2016)
    2. Emmanuel Issoze-Ngondet, Prime Minister of Gabon (2016–2019)
- Gambia
  - President – Yahya Jammeh, President of Gambia (1996–2017)
- Ghana
  - President – John Mahama, President of Ghana (2012–2017)
- Guinea
  - President – Alpha Condé, President of Guinea (2010–2021)
- Guinea-Bissau
  - President – José Mário Vaz, President of Guinea-Bissau (2014–2020)
  - Prime Minister –
    1. Carlos Correia, Prime Minister of Guinea-Bissau (2015–2016)
    2. Baciro Djá, Prime Minister of Guinea-Bissau (2016)
    3. Umaro Sissoco Embaló, Prime Minister of Guinea-Bissau (2016–2018)
- Kenya
  - President – Uhuru Kenyatta, President of Kenya (2013–2022)
- Lesotho
  - Monarch – Letsie III, Monarch of Lesotho (1996–present)
  - Prime Minister – Pakalitha Mosisili, Prime Minister of Lesotho (2015–2017)
- Liberia
  - President – Ellen Sirleaf Johnson, President of Liberia (2006–2018)
- Libya
  - President – Aguila Saleh Issa, Chairman of the Presidential Council (2014–2021)
  - Prime Minister –
    1. Abdullah al-Theni, Prime Minister of Libya (2014–2016)
    2. Fayez al-Sarraj, Prime Minister of Libya (2016–2021)
- Malawi
  - President – Peter Mutharika, President of Malawi (2014–2020)
- Mali
  - President – Ibrahim Boubacar Keïta, President of Mali (2013–2020)
  - Prime Minister – Modibo Keita, Prime Minister of Mali (2015–2017)
- Mauritania
  - President – Mohamed Ould Abdel Aziz, President of Mauritania (2009–2019)
  - Prime Minister – Yahya Ould Hademine, Prime Minister of Mauritania (2014–2018)
- Mauritius
  - President – Ameenah Gurib, President of Mauritius (2015–2018)
  - Prime Minister – Sir Anerood Jugnauth, Prime Minister of Mauritius (2014–2017)
- Morocco
  - King – Mohammed VI, King of Morocco (1999–present)
  - Prime Minister – Abdelilah Benkirane, Prime Minister of Morocco (2011–2017)
- Mozambique
  - President – Filipe Nyusi, President of Mozambique (2015–present)
  - Prime Minister – Carlos Agostinho do Rosário, Prime Minister of Mozambique (2015–2022)
- Namibia
  - President – Hage Geingob, President of Namibia (2015–2024)
  - Prime Minister – Saara Kuugongelwa-Amadhila, Prime Minister of Namibia (2015–present)
- Niger
  - President – Mahamadou Issoufou, President of Niger (2011–2021)
  - Prime Minister – Brigi Rafini, Prime Minister of Niger (2011–2021)
- Nigeria
  - President – Muhammadu Buhari, President of Nigeria (2015–2023)
- Rwanda
  - President – Paul Kagame, President of Rwanda (2000–present)
  - Prime Minister – Anastase Murekezi, Prime Minister of Rwanda (2014–2017)
- Sao Tome and Principe
  - President –
    1. Manuel Pinto da Costa, President of Sao Tome and Principe (2011–2016)
    2. Evaristo Carvalho, President of Sao Tome and Principe (2016–2021)
  - Prime Minister – Patrice Trovoada, Prime Minister of Sao Tome and Principe (2014–2018)
- Senegal
  - President – Macky Sall, President of Senegal (2012–2024)
  - Prime Minister – Mahammed Dionne, Prime Minister of Senegal (2014–2019)
- Seychelles
  - President –
    1. James Michel, President of Seychelles (2004–2016)
    2. Danny Faure, President of Seychelles (2016–2020)
- Sierra Leone
  - President – Ernest Bai Koroma, President of Sierra Leone (2007–2018)
- Somalia
  - President – Hassan Sheikh Mohamud, President of Somalia (2012–2017)
  - Prime Minister – Omar Sharmarke, Prime Minister of Somalia (2014–2017)
- South Africa
  - President – Jacob Zuma, President of South Africa (2009–2018)
- South Sudan
  - President – Salva Kiir, President of South Sudan (2011–present)
- Sudan
  - President – Omar al-Bashir, President of Sudan (1989–2019)
- Tanzania
  - President – John Magufuli, President of Tanzania (2015–2021)
  - Prime Minister – Kassim Majaliwa, Prime Minister of Tanzania (2015–2025)
- Togo
  - President – Faure Gnassingbé, President of Togo (2005–present)
  - Prime Minister – Komi Sélom Klassou, Prime Minister of Togo (2015–2020)
- Tunisia
  - President – Beji Caid Essebsi, President of Tunisia (2014–2019)
  - Prime Minister –
    1. Habib Essid, Prime Minister of Tunisia (2015–2016)
    2. Youssef Chahed, Prime Minister of Tunisia (2016–2020)
- Uganda
  - President – Yoweri Museveni, President of Uganda (1986–present)
  - Prime Minister – Ruhakana Rugunda, Prime Minister of Uganda (2014–2021)
- Zambia
  - President – Edgar Lungu, President of Zambia (2015–2021)
- Zimbabwe
  - President – Robert Mugabe, President of Zimbabwe (1987–2017)

== Predicted and scheduled events ==
=== January ===
- Central African Republic presidential election of 2016

=== February ===
- February 18 - Ugandan general election, 2016
- February 21
  - Comorian presidential election, 2016
  - Niger presidential election
- February 28 - Benin presidential election
- Cape Verdean parliamentary election, 2016

=== March ===
- March 20 - Republic of Congo presidential election

=== April ===
- April 8 - Djiboutian presidential election, 2016
- April 10 - Chadian presidential election, 2016

=== August ===
- Cape Verdean presidential election, 2016

=== September ===
- September 20 - Zambian general election, 2016

=== November ===
- November 7 - Ghanaian general election, 2016
- November 27 - Democratic Republic of the Congo general election, 2016

=== December ===
- Gabonese legislative election, 2016

=== Unknown date ===
- Moroccan general election, 2016
- Next Somali parliamentary election

== See also ==
- List of state leaders in 2016 § Africa
