= 2024 in Africa =

This is a list of events that took place in Africa in 2024.

== Incumbents ==
- Algeria
  - President – Abdelmadjid Tebboune, President of Algeria (2019–present)
  - Prime Minister – Nadir Larbaoui, Prime Minister of Algeria (2023–2025)
- Angola
  - President – João Lourenço, President of Angola (2017–present)
- Benin
  - President – Patrice Talon, President of Benin (2016–present)
- Botswana
  - President –
    1. Mokgweetsi Masisi, President of Botswana (2018–2024)
    2. Duma Boko, President of Botswana (2024–present)
- Burundi
  - President – Évariste Ndayishimiye, President of Burundi (2020–present)
  - Prime Minister – Gervais Ndirakobuca, Prime Minister of Burundi (2022–present)
- Cameroon
  - President – Paul Biya, President of Cameroon (1982–present)
  - Prime Minister – Joseph Ngute, Prime Minister of Cameroon (2019–present)
- Cape Verde
  - President – Jose Maria Neves, President of Cape Verde (2021–present)
  - Prime Minister – Ulisses Correia e Silva, Prime Minister of Cape Verde (2016–present)
- Central African Republic
  - President – Faustin-Archange Touadéra, Transitional President of Central African Republic (2016–present)
  - Prime Minister – Félix Moloua, Prime Minister of Central African Republic (2022–present)
- Chad
  - President – Mahamat Déby, President of Chad (2021–present)
  - Prime Minister –
    1. Saleh Kebzabo, Prime Minister of Chad (2022–2024)
    2. Succès Masra, Prime Minister of Chad (2024)
    3. Allamaye Halina, Prime Minister of Chad (2024–present)
- Comoros
  - President – Azali Assoumani, President of Comoros (2019–present)
- Republic of the Congo
  - President – Denis Sassou Nguesso, President of the Republic of the Congo (1997–present)
  - Prime Minister – Anatole Collinet Makosso, Prime Minister of the Republic of the Congo (2021–present)
- Côte d'Ivoire
  - President – Alassane Ouattara, President of Côte d'Ivoire (2010–present)
  - Prime Minister – Robert Beugré Mambé, Prime Minister of Côte d'Ivoire (2023–present)
- Democratic Republic of the Congo
  - President – Félix Tshisekedi, President of the Democratic Republic of the Congo (2019–present)
  - Prime Minister –
    1. Sama Lukonde, Prime Minister of the Democratic Republic of the Congo (2021–2024)
    2. Judith Suminwa, Prime Minister of the Democratic Republic of the Congo (2024–present)
- Djibouti
  - President – Ismaïl Omar Guelleh, President of Djibouti (1999–present)
  - Prime Minister – Abdoulkader Kamil Mohamed, Prime Minister of Djibouti (2013–present)
- Egypt
  - President – Abdel Fattah el-Sisi, President of Egypt (2014–present)
  - Prime Minister – Mostafa Madbouly, Prime Minister of Egypt (2018–present)
- Equatorial Guinea
  - President – Teodoro Obiang Nguema Mbasogo, President of Equatorial Guinea (1982–present)
  - Prime Minister –
    1. Manuela Roka Botey, Prime Minister of Equatorial Guinea (2023–2024)
    2. Manuel Osa Nsue Nsua, Prime Minister of Equatorial Guinea (2024–present)
- Eritrea
  - President – Isaias Afwerki, President of Eritrea (1993–present)
- Ethiopia
  - President –
    1. Sahle-Work Zewde, President of Ethiopia (2018–2024)
    2. Taye Atske Selassie, President of Ethiopia (2024–present)
  - Prime Minister – Abiy Ahmed, Prime Minister of Ethiopia (2018–present)
- Gabon
  - President – Vacant, President of Gabon (2023-2025)
  - Prime Minister – Raymond Ndong Sima, Prime Minister of Gabon (2023-2025)
- Gambia
  - President – Adama Barrow, President of Gambia (2017-present)
- Ghana
  - President – Nana Akufo-Addo, President of Ghana (2017-2025)
- Guinea
  - President – Mamady Doumbouya, President of Guinea (2021-present)
- Guinea-Bissau
  - President – Umaro Sissoco Embaló, President of Guinea-Bissau (2020–2025)
  - Prime Minister – Rui Duarte de Barros, Prime Minister of Guinea-Bissau (2023–2025)
- Kenya
  - President – William Ruto, President of Kenya (2022–present)
- Lesotho
  - Monarch – Letsie III, Monarch of Lesotho (1996–present)
  - Prime Minister – Sam Matekane, Prime Minister of Lesotho (2022–present)
- Liberia
  - President –
    1. George Weah, President of Liberia (2018–2024)
    2. Joseph Boakai, President of Liberia (2024–present)
- Libya
  - President – Mohamed al-Menfi, Chairman of the Presidential Council (2021–present)
  - Prime Minister – Abdul Hamid Dbeibeh, Prime Minister of Libya (2021–present)
- Malawi
  - President – Lazarus Chakwera, President of Malawi (2020–2025)
- Mali
  - President – Assimi Goita, President of Mali (2021–present)
  - Prime Minister –
    1. Choguel Kokalla Maïga, Prime Minister of Mali (2021–2024)
    2. Abdoulaye Maïga, Prime Minister of Mali (2024–present)
- Mauritania
  - President – Mohamed Ould Ghazouani, President of Mauritania (2019–present)
  - Prime Minister –
    1. Mohamed Ould Bilal, Prime Minister of Mauritania (2020–2024)
    2. Mokhtar Ould Djay, Prime Minister of Mauritania (2024–present)
- Mauritius
  - President –
    1. Prithvirajsing Roopun, President of Mauritius (2019–2024)
    2. Dharam Gokhool, President of Mauritius (2024–present)
  - Prime Minister –
    1. Pravind Jugnauth, Prime Minister of Mauritius (2017–2024)
    2. Dr. Navin Ramgoolam, Prime Minister of Mauritius (2024–present)
- Morocco
  - King – Mohammed VI, King of Morocco (1999–present)
  - Prime Minister – Aziz Akhannouch, Prime Minister of Morocco (2022–present)
- Mozambique
  - President – Filipe Nyusi, President of Mozambique (2015–2025)
  - Prime Minister – Adriano Maleiane, Prime Minister of Mozambique (2022–2025)
- Namibia
  - President –
    1. Hage Geingob, President of Namibia (2015–2024)
    2. Nangolo Mbumba, President of Namibia (2024–present)
  - Prime Minister – Saara Kuugongelwa-Amadhila, Prime Minister of Namibia (2015-2025)
- Niger
  - President – Abdourahamane Tiani, President of Niger (2023–present)
  - Prime Minister – Ali Lamine Zeine, Prime Minister of Niger (2023–present)
- Nigeria
  - President – Bola Ahmed Tinubu, President of Nigeria (2023–present)
- Rwanda
  - President – Paul Kagame, President of Rwanda (2000–present)
  - Prime Minister – Édouard Ngirente, Prime Minister of Rwanda (2017–2025)
- Sao Tome and Principe
  - President – Carlos Vila Nova, President of Sao Tome and Principe (2021–present)
  - Prime Minister – Patrice Trovoada, Prime Minister of Sao Tome and Principe (2022–2025)
- Senegal
  - President –
    1. Macky Sall, President of Senegal (2012–2024)
    2. Bassirou Diomaye Faye, President of Senegal (2024–present)
  - Prime Minister –
    1. Ousmane Sonko, Prime Minister of Senegal (2022–2024)
    2. Sidiki Kaba, Prime Minister of Senegal (2024)
    3. Ousmane Sonko, Prime Minister of Senegal (2024–present)
- Seychelles
  - President – Wavel Ramkalawan, President of Seychelles (2020–2025)
- Sierra Leone
  - President – Julius Maada Wonie Bio, President of Sierra Leone (2018–present)
- Somalia
  - President – Hassan Sheikh Mohamud, President of Somalia (2022–present)
  - Prime Minister – Hamza Abdi Barre, Prime Minister of Somalia (2022–present)
- South Africa
  - President – Cyril Ramaphosa, President of South Africa (2018–present)
- South Sudan
  - President – Salva Kiir, President of South Sudan (2011–present)
- Sudan
  - President – Transitional Sovereignty Council (2021–present)
- Tanzania
  - President – Samia Suluhu Hassan, President of Tanzania (2021–present)
  - Prime Minister – Kassim Majaliwa, Prime Minister of Tanzania (2015–2025)
- Togo
  - President – Faure Gnassingbé, President of Togo (2005–present)
  - Prime Minister – Victoire Tomegah Dogbé, Prime Minister of Togo (2020–2025)
- Tunisia
  - President – Kais Saied, President of Tunisia (2019–present)
  - Prime Minister –
    1. Ahmed Hachani, Prime Minister of Tunisia (2023–2024)
    2. Kamel Madouri, Prime Minister of Tunisia (2024–2025)
- Uganda
  - President – Yoweri Museveni, President of Uganda (1986–present)
  - Prime Minister – Robinah Nabbanja, Prime Minister of Uganda (2021–present)
- Zambia
  - President – Hakainde Hichilema, President of Zambia (2021–present)
- Zimbabwe
  - President – Emmerson Mnangagwa, President of Zimbabwe (2017–present)

== Events ==
=== January ===
- 1 January
  - Egypt and Ethiopia become BRICS members.
  - Ethiopia announces an agreement with Somaliland to use the port of Berbera. Ethiopia also says that it will eventually recognize Somaliland's independence, becoming the first country to do so.
- 14 January – 2024 Comorian presidential election: Amid an opposition boycott, incumbent president Azali Assoumani wins re-election with 62.9% of the vote and only 16.3% voter turnout.

=== February ===
- 4 February – President of Namibia Hage Geingob dies at the age of 82, and is succeeded by his vice-president Nangolo Mbumba.

=== March ===
- 24 March – 2024 Senegalese presidential election: Bassirou Diomaye Faye is elected president after his party and its former candidate Ousmane Sonko were disqualified.

=== May ===
- 6 May – 2024 Chadian presidential election: Mahamat Déby wins election to a full term as president, succeeding his father Idriss Déby.
- 19 May – A coup d'état attempt in the Democratic Republic of the Congo reportedly led by Christian Malanga leads to unrest in Kinshasa. Government soldiers quickly intervene, arresting the coup leaders and reportedly restoring calm.
- 29 May
  - 2024 South African general election: The ANC party fails to win a majority of the vote for the first time in South Africa's democratic history.
  - 2024 Malagasy parliamentary election: President Andry Rajoelina's party, Tanora Malagasy Vonona, loses their majority at the National Assembly, winning only 80 seats out of 163.

=== June ===
- 10 June – A plane crash near Chikangawa, Malawi, kills nine people, including Vice President of Malawi Saulos Chilima.
- 14 June – 2024 South African general election: The ANC and other opposition parties agree to form a national unity government, with Cyril Ramaphosa being re-elected President of South Africa.
- 29 June
  - 2024 Mauritanian presidential election: Incumbent president Mohamed Ould Ghazouani wins re-election to a second term.
  - 2024 Borno State bombings: 30 people are killed and 100 are injured when three separate bomb blasts occur in the town of Gwoza in Borno State, Nigeria.

=== July ===
- 15 July – 2024 Rwandan general election: Incumbent Paul Kagame is reelected for a fourth term.
- 31 July – Moussa Dadis Camara, the former military ruler of Guinea, is found guilty of crimes against humanity in the massacres that occurred in 2009 and is sentenced to twenty years in prison by a Guinean court.

=== August ===
- 14 August – The World Health Organization (WHO) declares mpox a public health emergency of international concern for the second time in two years, following the spread of the virus in African countries.
- 24 August – In Barsalogho, Burkina Faso, 600 civilians are victims of a massacre by Islamists associated with Al-Qaeda.

=== October ===
- 6 October – 2024 Tunisian presidential election: Incumbent Kais Saied is reelected for a second term.
- 9 October – 2024 Mozambican general election: Daniel Chapo is elected president while the ruling FRELIMO party retains a majority in the Assembly of the Republic.
- 24 October – The first case of the 2024 Kwango province disease outbreak is reported in the Democratic Republic of the Congo.
- 30 October – 2024 Botswana general election: The ruling BDP party is voted out of power, ending 58 years of uninterrupted governance. Duma Boko of the UDC party is elected President of Botswana.

=== November ===
- 10 November – 2024 Mauritian general election: The electoral alliance Lepep of incumbent Prime Minister Pravind Jugnauth is defeated by that of opposition leader and former Prime Minister Navin Ramgoolam, with the latter taking all but two seats.
- 13 November – 2024 Somaliland presidential election: Opposition candidate Abdirahman Mohamed Abdullahi of the Waddani party is elected president.
- 16 November
  - The 2024 Gabonese constitutional referendum is held and approved.
  - Algerian dissident writer Boualem Sansal is put in custody by Algerian authorities after his landing in Algiers.
- 17 November – 2024 Senegalese parliamentary election: President Bassirou Diomaye Faye's party PASTEF wins an absolute majority at the National Assembly.
- 27 November – 2024 Namibian general election: Netumbo Nandi-Ndaitwah of the SWAPO party is elected as the first female president of Namibia.

=== December ===
- 14 December – Cyclone Chido makes landfall in Mayotte, causing at least 20 deaths and bringing devastating damage to the island.

== See also ==
- 2024 in African music
