= Asfaw Wossen =

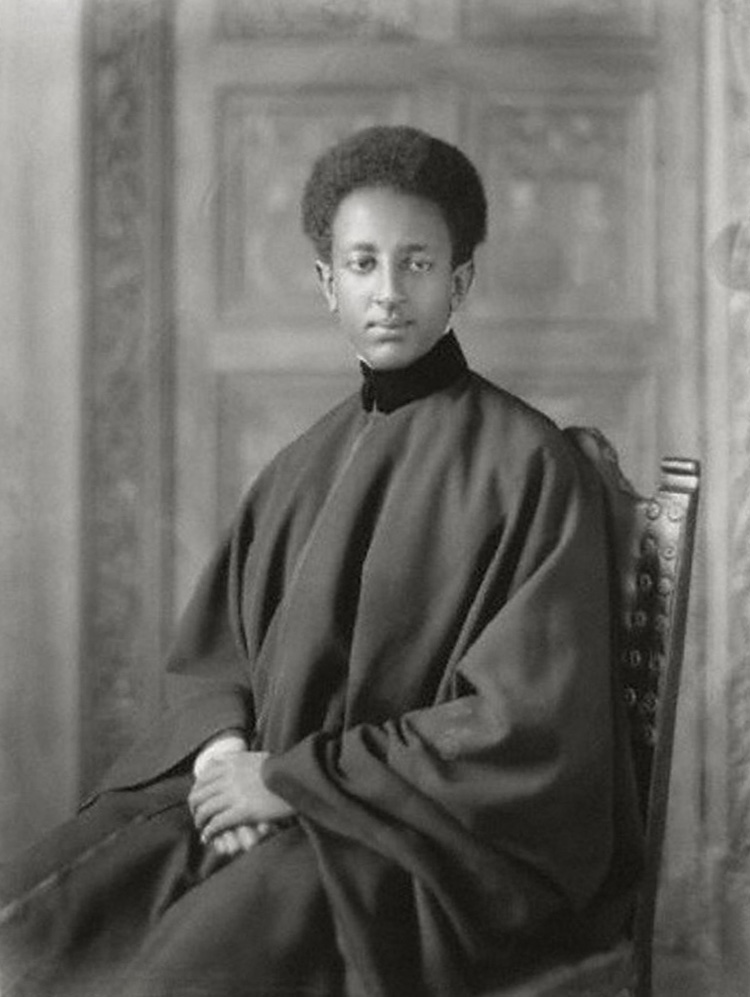
- Asfaw Wossen, Crown Prince of Ethiopia
- Pronunciation: āsfā wɔsːən
- Gender: Male
- Language: Amharic, Tigrinya, Gurage

Origin
- Language: Ge'ez
- Meaning: "Expand the boundaries"

Other names
- Variant forms: Asfawessen, Asfa Wossen, Asfawosen

Asfaw Wossen (Amharic: አስፋ ወሰን, āsfā wossen) is an Ethiopic male given name.

== Persons named Asfaw Wossen ==
- Asfaw Wossen Amha Iyasus, ruler of Shewa in the later 18th century.
- Asfa-Wossen Asserate, author, political consultant, and aristocrat,
- Asfaw Wossen Haile Selassie, eldest son and heir of Emperor Haile Selassie I, who later adopted the regnal name of Amha Selassie I in pretense.
