= Great Recession in Africa =

As a direct result of the late 2000s recession, some economies in Africa have been primarily affected by reduced global demand and lower prices of commodities such as oil, platinum, nickel, gold, and copper. South Africa was the first African country to fall in recession. Other countries like Morocco and Egypt, which benefited from their previous high economic growth experienced a great decline due to the global economic crisis without falling in recession.

== South Africa ==
Moody's Investors Service warned on July 7, 2008 that South Africa could slip into a recession by the turn of the year. Moody's cited electricity shortages, high interest rates, soaring inflation, a slumping housing and vehicle market and lower business and consumer confidence indicators. Growth in South Africa's real gross domestic product for the first quarter of 2008 slowed to 0.39%. CPIX inflation, the monetary-policy inflation target measure, rose 10.9% on a year-on-year basis in May, its highest level since November 2002. South Africa's National Treasury criticized the statement by Moody's saying, "It's not possible that we'll end up in recession." He added that the government may revise lower its 4 percent growth forecast for the year following growth of 5.1% in 2007. Car sales in South Africa dropped an annual 22 percent in June due to higher interest rates.
