= African Leaders State of Africa Report =

- Categories: African politics
- Frequency: Annual
- Publisher: African Presidential Archives and Research Center, Boston University
- Founded: 2003
- Final issue: 2013
- Country: United States
- Based in: Boston
- Website: www.bu.edu/aparc/report/
- OCLC: 53326233

The African Leaders' State of Africa Report offered a commentary on politics and policies from the perspective of the individuals shaping those trends. The Report was started in 2003. The goal was to provide a platform for political leaders in Africa to express their views about political developments in the region. The last issue is dated 2013.
