= Koreans in Africa =

Ethnic group

Total population
- 9,200

Regions with significant populations
- South Africa: 3,949
- Libya: 964
- Nigeria: 800
- Kenya: 726
- Egypt: 685
- Ghana: 614
- Morocco: 310
- Tanzania: 238
- Botswana: 200
- Uganda: 196
- Rwanda: 190
- Ivory Coast: 180
- Ethiopia: 174
- Senegal: 164

Languages
- Korean, English, others

Related ethnic groups
- Koreans

Koreans in Africa form a very small population, estimated at only 9,200 people in 2005, with almost half of these living in South Africa. South Korean nationals can be found in 49 countries of Africa, including the continent and its surrounding islands; they have established schools in 19 of those countries. They form a small part of the Korean diaspora.

== History ==
South Africa considered importing labourers from Korea as early as 1903 in order to control rising mining wages, but eventually decided on Chinese workers instead.

=== North Koreans ===
In the past, North Korea ran several military and civil assistance programmes to some of Africa's more radical states, including Guinea, Ethiopia, Zimbabwe, Mali and Tanzania. North Korea, in return, was able to gain diplomatic recognition and other leverage; they were successful in ensuring South Korea was unable to join the Non-Aligned Movement. For Egypt, the relationship was especially close; North Korean pilots flew Egyptian fighters in the 1973 Yom Kippur War and Egypt exported Scud missiles to North Korea. Egypt even had diplomatic relations established with Israel before it had relations with South Korea.

North Korea was also involved in several armed insurgency movements in Angola, Rhodesia and in the Seychelles, and provided support to the African National Congress and South West Africa People's Organization (SWAPO). In 1984, 3,000 North Korean military advisers were dispatched to Angola, and later were reportedly engaged in combat operations with the People's Armed Forces for the Liberation of Angola (FAPLA). Around the same time there were some North Koreans in Lesotho involved in training for the Youth League of the Basotho National Party's Vincent Makhele faction, but they were expelled due to pressure from South Africa in early 1986.

In the 1990s and beyond, as governments in Africa became more pragmatic and South Korea's economic position became clearly superior to that of the North's, North Korea's influence in Africa declined.

=== South Koreans ===
During the wave of Korean labour migration to the Arab world in the 1970s and 1980s, many Koreans went to Arab countries of North Africa, including Libya, and to a lesser extent, Egypt and Sudan. Though Libya did not receive its first South Korean workers until 1977, it was the only Arab country which experienced consistent growth in the number of Korean workers between 1981 and 1985. By 1985 it had already become the Arab world's second most popular destination, with 23,138 arrivals from South Korea. In total, from 1977 until 1985, 103,953 South Koreans went to Libya. The Korean community in Nigeria consists of 550 construction engineers from South Korean construction companies Daewoo and Hyundai Heavy Industries, 240 local residents, and 10 missionaries sent by Christian churches in South Korea. There is also a small population of roughly 200 Koreans in Botswana, largely formed by employees of South Korean automobile manufacturers; 154 live in the capital Gaborone. In late 2008, there were media reports that roughly 30 or 40 immigration brokers in Seoul's Gangnam-gu were helping South Korean parents to obtain permanent residency in Mali and other African countries so that they could enroll their children in international schools at home.

== Education ==
The Cairo Korean School, founded on 5 December 1979 is Africa's only Korean day school and the earliest registered Korean educational institution of any kind in Africa; it enrolled 84 elementary school students and 119 middle school students as of September 2007. Weekend Korean language schools for South Korean nationals have been established in eighteen other African countries as well, enrolling a total of 640 students. These are listed below (ordered by date of founding of the earliest school):

Country	City	Date	School name	↓ Teachers Students ↓		Levels	Ref.
Kenya	Nairobi	1 March 1981	나이로비한인학교; Nairobi Hanin Hakgyo; Nairobi Koreans' School	8	58	Kindergarten & elementary	
Ghana		1 September 1981	재 가나 토요한글학교; Jae Gana Toyo Hangeul Hakgyo; Ghana Saturday Hangul School	6	72	Kindergarten to high school	
Ethiopia		24 February 1984	주 이디오피아한글학교; Ju Idiopia Hangeul Hakgyo; Ethiopia Hangul School	2	13	Elementary	
Senegal	Dakar	1 October 1986	다카르한글학교; Dakareu Hangeul Hakgyo; Dakar Hangul School	7	23	Elementary & middle school	
Ivory Coast	Abidjan	8 July 1987	아비쟝한글학교; Abijang Hangeul Hakgyo; Abidjan Hangul School	8	49	Kindergarten & elementary	
Mauritania	Nouadhibou	15 April 1988	누아디브한글학교; Nuadibeu Hangeul Hakgyo; Nouadhibou Hangul School	2	9	Kindergarten to high school	
Morocco	Rabat	7 October 1989	카사,라바트한글학교; Kasa, Rabateu Hangeul Hakgyo; Casablanca-Rabat Hangul School	5	22	Kindergarten to middle school	
Morocco	Agadir	12 January 1991	아가딜한글학교; Agadil Hangeul Hakgyo; Agadir Hangul School	3	11	Kindergarten to middle school	
Egypt	Cairo	1 September 1990	카이로한국학교부설토요학교; Kairo Hanguk Hakgyo Buseol Toyo Hakgyo; Weekend School of Cairo Korean School	3	15	Elementary	
Gabon		21 January 1991	가봉한글학교; Gabong Hangeul Hakgyo; Gabon Hangul School	3	16	Elementary	
Nigeria	Lagos	21 January 1991	재 나이지리아 토요한글학교; Jae Naijiria Toyo Hangeul Hakgyo; Nigeria Saturday Hangul School	4	12	Elementary	
Tanzania	Dar es Salaam	1 May 1993	탄자니아한글학교; Tanjania Hangeul Hakgyo; Tanzania Hangul School	5	27	Kindergarten to middle school	
Togo	Lomé	2 July 1994	재 토고 토요한글학교; Jae Togo Toyo Hangeul Hakgyo; Togo Saturday Hangul School	4	27	Kindergarten to high school	
South Africa	Johannesburg	1 March 1992	요하네스버그한글학교; Yohaneseubeogeu Hangeul Hakgyo; Johannesburg Korean School	22	110	Kindergarten to middle school	
South Africa	Pretoria	4 February 1995	프레토리아한글학교; Peuretoria Hangeul Hakgyo; Pretoria Hangul School	8	46	Kindergarten to middle school	
South Africa	Cape Town	10 March 2001	케이프타운한글학교; Keipeutaun Hangeul Hakgyo; Cape Town Hangul School	10	30	Kindergarten to high school	
Uganda		1 April 1995	우간다한인학교; Uganda Hanin Hakgyo; Uganda Koreans' School	6	26	Kindergarten & elementary	
Tunisia	Tunis	11 November 1996	튀니스한글학교; Twiniseu Hangeul Hakgyo; Tunis Hangul School	4	10	Elementary	
Zimbabwe	Harare	3 March 1997	하라레한글학교; Harare Hangeul Hakgyo; Harare Hangul School	4	10	Kindergarten & elementary	
Botswana	Gaborone	10 January 1998	보츠나와한글학교; Bocheunawa Hangeul Hakgyo; Botswana Hangul School	5	23	Elementary to high school	
Cameroon	Douala	1 January 2000	두알라한글학교; Dualla Hangeul Hakgyo; Douala Hangul School	4	25	Kindergarten to middle school	
Cameroon	Yaoundé	1 January 2000	야운데한글학교; Yaunde Hangeul Hakgyo; Yaoundé Hangul School	8	12	Elementary to high school	
Libya		1 January 2000	재리비아주말한글학교; Jae Ribia Jumal Hangeul Hakgyo; Libya Weekend Hangul School	?	22	Kindergarten to high school	

== See also ==
- Asian Africans
- Asian South Africans
