= Uranium mining by country =

The world's largest producer of uranium is Kazakhstan, which in 2019 produced 43% of the world's mining output. Canada was the next largest producer with a 13% share, followed by Australia with 12%. Uranium has been mined in every continent except Antarctica.

== Africa ==
=== Democratic Republic of the Congo (DRC) ===
Uranium mining in the DRC ceased in 2004 with the closure of the Shinkolobwe mine. Uranium for the Manhattan Project nuclear bombs that were used in the bombing of Hiroshima and Nagasaki at the end of the Second World War came from Shinkolobwe, in the mineral rich province of Katanga, at that time in the Belgian Congo. In 2009 the French conglomerate Areva executed an agreement with the Congolese Minister of Mines on uranium prospecting and mining. Work would start with a detailed inventory of mining sites and an update of all databases. In 2011 Areva disclosed that it was unlikely to develop a uranium mine in the DRC until the country became more politically stable.

=== Gabon ===
In Gabon, mining used to occur in Oklo, but the deposits are reported to be exhausted. In 1972, remains of a natural nuclear fission reactor were found at the Oklo deposits.

=== Malawi ===
Uranium is produced at Kayelekera mine near Karonga. The mine is owned and operated by Australian company, Paladin Energy. As of 2014, the mine is under 'care and maintenance' due to weak uranium prices.

=== Namibia ===
Namibia produces uranium from three of the world's largest open pit uranium mines. The China National Nuclear Corporation-owned Rössing mine produced 2,478 tonnes (5,463,000 lb) of U_{3}O_{8} in 2018. The China General Nuclear Power Group-owned Husab Mine produced 3,571 tonnes (7,873,000 lb) of U_{3}O_{8} in 2018.

The Langer Heinrich calcrete uranium deposit was discovered in 1973 and an open pit mine officially opened in 2007, producing until 2018, when the Paladin Energy-China National Nuclear Corporation joint venture was placed on care and maintenance, due to a sustained low uranium price. Production in 2017 was 1,882 tonnes (4,149,000 lb) of U_{3}O_{8}.

=== Niger ===
Niger was Africa's leading uranium-producing nation until 2016, when it was overtaken by Namibia. In 2019 it was the world's fifth largest producer, with 6% of production. Uranium is produced from the Somair mine at Arlit, 63.4% owned by Orano Cycle and 36.66% by Niger state mining assets company Société du patrimoine des mines du Niger, known as SOPAMIN, and has produced nearly 68,000 tonnes (149,900,000 pounds) of uranium since operations began in 1971; and the Akouta mine at Akokan, owned by Orano Cycle (34%), SOPAMIN (31%), Overseas Uranium Resources Development Co of Japan (25%) and Enusa Industrias Avanzadas SA of Spain (10%), and has produced more than 70,000 tonnes (154,300,000 pounds) of uranium since the start of operations in 1978.

=== South Africa ===
South Africa produces uranium from deposits in Archean quartz-pebble conglomerates of the Witwatersrand Basin, at Brakpan and Krugersdorp, Gauteng. The Karoo contains several sandstone-hosted Permian uranium deposits around Beaufort West in the Western Cape.

== Asia ==
=== China ===
China mined in 2007 636 tonnes of U_{3}O_{8}, a decrease of 17% of its production in 2006.

=== India ===
In Nalgonda District, the Rajiv Gandhi Tiger Reserve (the only tiger project in Telangana ) has been forced to surrender over 3,000 sq. kilometres to uranium mining, following a directive from the Central Ministry of Environment and Forests.

In 2007, India was able to extract 229 tonnes of U_{3}O_{8} from its soil.

The Department of Atomic Energy (DAE) recently discovered that the upcoming mine in Tumalapalli has close to 49,000 tonnes of uranium reserves. This could just be a shot in the arm for India's nuclear power aspirations as it is three times the original estimate of the area's deposits.

=== Jordan ===
Jordan is estimated to have inferred mineral resources of 62,000 tonnes of uranium, including 33,300 tonnes in central Jordan, and 28,700 tonnes in the Hasa-Qatrana area, plus a further 100,000 tonnes in phosphate deposits. No uranium has been mined from the country.

=== Commonwealth of Independent States ===
==== Kazakhstan ====
Kazakhstan is the world's largest uranium producer, with some 19,477 tonnes of U_{3}O_{8} (43 million pounds) in 2020, 41% of the world's supply. In 2019 five of Kazatomprom's ISR mining groups were among the world's ten largest uranium mines.

==== Russia ====
The World Nuclear Association states that Russia has known uranium deposits of 500,000 tonnes and planned to mine 11,000 to 12,000 tonnes per year from deposits in the South Urals, Western Siberia, and Siberia east of Lake Baikal, by 2010.

The Russian nuclear industry underwent an overall restructuring process in 2007. The production was high as almost 4,000 tons of tU_{3}O_{8} (8.8 million pounds) from three operating mines in 2007. Atomredmetzoloto reported that the Priargunsky mine yielded 3,538 tonnes (7.8 million pounds) in 2007, a slight decline from the 3,719 tonnes (8.2 million pounds) reported by TVEL in 2006. At the Dalur (Dolmatovskoye) and Khiagda ISR mines, production of 412 tonnes (910,000 pounds) and 30 tonnes (68,000 pounds), respectively, was reached in 2007. Both ISR projects are expected to increase production steadily through 2015.

==== Uzbekistan ====
In Uzbekistan, the Navoi Mining and Metallurgical Company reportedly produced 2,721 tonnes of U_{3}O_{8} or tU_{3}O_{8} (6 million pounds) from its Nurabad, Uchkuduk and Zafarabad in-situ recovery facilities.

=== Mongolia ===
Mongolia has reserves of uranium approximating 41,521 tonnes in total. A single mine at Mardai was operated between 1989 and 1995, producing 2,400 tonnes of uranium per year. No uranium mining is being undertaken in Mongolia in 2021, though mines are being planned.

== Australia ==
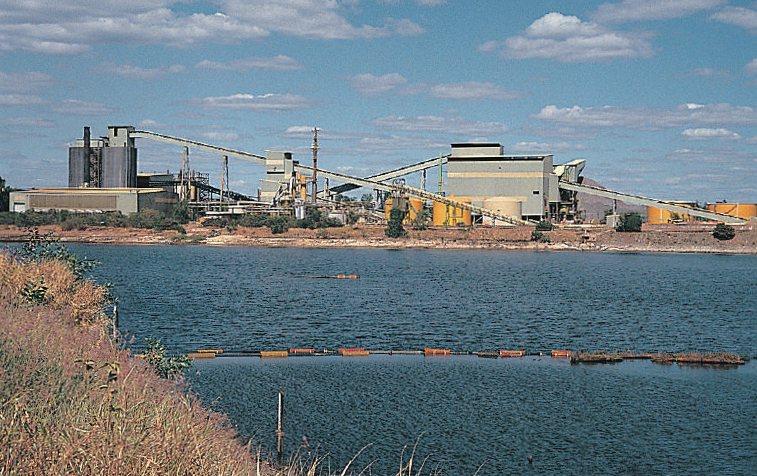
The Ranger Uranium Mine in Australia.

Expenditure ($millions/quarter) on uranium exploration in Australia since 1988

Production in Australia rose significantly to 10,115 tU_{3}O_{8} (22.3 million pounds) in 2007 from 9,000 tonnes (19.7 million pounds) in 2006, securing its position as the second largest uranium producing country, most of the production gain coming from increased operational performance and increase in the grade of the ore mined.

Australia has the world's largest uranium reserves, 24% of the planet's known reserves. The majority of these reserves are located in South Australia with other important deposits in Queensland, Western Australia and the Northern Territory.

The Olympic Dam mine run by BHP in South Australia is combined with mining of copper, gold, and silver, and has reserves of global significance. There are currently three operating uranium mines in Australia, and several more have been proposed. The expansion of Australia's uranium mines was supported by the Gillard government. The Australian Labor Party abandoned its long-standing and controversial "no new uranium mines" policy in April 2007. One of the more controversial proposals was Jabiluka, to be built surrounded by the World Heritage listed Kakadu National Park. The existing Ranger Uranium Mine is also surrounded by the National Park, as the mine area was not included in the original listing of the park.

Uranium mining and export and related nuclear issues have often been the subject of public debate, and the anti-nuclear movement in Australia has a long history.

== Europe ==
=== Bulgaria ===
Bulgaria shut down its facilities for environmental reasons in 1992; terrains were recultivated but recently, there has been certain interest in resuming activities. Industrial mining first started in 1938 and was resumed after 1944 by a joint Soviet–Bulgarian mining company, reorganized in 1956 into the Redki Metali (Rare Metals) government-owned concern. At its peak, it had 13,000 employees, and operated 48 uranium mines and two milling plants at Buhovo outside Sofia and Eleshnitsa near Bansko. Yearly production was estimated at 645 t met about 55% of the needs of Kozloduy Nuclear Power Plant, which had six reactors with a total output of over 3600 MWe at its peak.

=== Czech Republic ===
The Czech Republic is the birthplace of industrial-scale uranium mining. Uranium mining at Jáchymov (at that time named Joachimsthal and belonging to Austria-Hungary) started in the 1890s on an industrial scale, after the silver and cobalt production of the deposit declined. Uranium was first utilised to produce mainly yellow colours for glass and porcelain manufacture. After the Curies in France discovered the polonium and radium in tailings from Jáchymov, the town became the first place in the world for commercial radium production from uranium ore. Radioactive water from the mines was also used to set up a health resort still existing today for radon-treatments. Pre–Cold War production is estimated to be around 1,000 t of uranium. From 1947 on Czechoslovakia started producing uranium for the Soviet Union. Early mining sites, such as Jáchymov, Horní Slavkov and Příbram, became known as parts of the "Czech Gulag". On the whole, Czechoslovakia produced 110,000 t of uranium in 1992 from 64 uranium deposits. The largest deposit Příbram (vein style) produced about 50,000 t of uranium and was mined to a depth of over 1,800 m.

The Rožná underground facility 55 km northwest of Brno was Central Europe's last operating uranium mine continuously operating since 1957. It produced about 300 t of uranium annually till 27 April 2017 when the last ore was mined.

The Czech Republic still has deposits of uranium ore but mining is not planned in the near future due to the low price of uranium.

=== Estonia ===
During 1946–1952, the Dictyonema argillite (claystone) was mined and used for uranium production in Sillamäe.

=== Finland ===
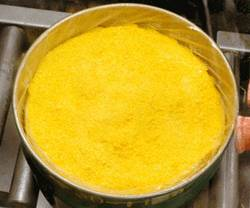
A drum of yellowcake

In Uusimaa, Karelia and Lapland in Finland, presently (2009) uranium deposits are being investigated.

In addition, Talvivaara Mining Company plc announced in early 2010 the commencement of uranium recovery as a by-product out of its mine producing mainly nickel, copper, zinc and cobalt in Sotkamo, eastern Finland. Production is expected to be approximately 350 tons of yellowcake annually, making Finland almost self-sufficient in uranium, accounting for approximately 80% of annual demand. However, as Finland lacks the required processing facilities to convert yellowcake into nuclear fuel, the mine's output will need to be sent abroad for refining and enrichment.

=== France ===
Uranium was mined in France between 1948 and 2001.

=== Germany ===
The search for uranium ore intensified during the Cold War. In East Germany an extensive uranium mining industry was established. Uranium was mined from 1947 to 1990 from mines in Saxony and Thuringia by the SDAG Wismut. It was mostly used by the Soviet Union to build nuclear fission weapons, and also as fuel for nuclear power plants. In West Germany more limited mining took place at Ellweiler, Rheinland-Pfalz (1959–1964), and Menzenschwand, Baden-Württemberg (1961–1991).

All uranium mines were closed after German reunification for environmental reasons. Some areas were heavily contaminated and clean-up is still not finished. Total production in East Germany was 230,400 t of uranium, making it the third largest producer in history behind the US and Canada. Minor production still takes place at the Königstein mine southeast of Dresden from cleaning of mine water. This production has been 38 t of uranium in 2007.

=== Hungary ===
In Hungary, uranium mining began in the 1950s around Pécs to supply the country's first atomic plant in Paks. A whole district was built for the mining industry on the outskirt of Pécs, for which the name Uránváros (Uranium city) was given. After the fall of communism, uranium mining was gradually given up because of the high production costs. That caused serious economic problems and a rise in unemployment in Pécs. Recently an Australian company took up the challenge to search for uranium in the Mecsek.

=== Portugal ===
Portugal has some uranium exploration around the Northern Alentejo town of Nisa, although further exploration of this area is subject to resistance from environmental groups There is also a uranium ore mine in the town of Canas de Senhorim (Viseu) .

=== Romania ===
Romania produced in 2008 around 250 tonnes of uranium, see SovRoms, Crucea – Botușana mine, and Băița mine.

At the village Ciudanovița in the Banat region in the south west of Romania there are closed down mines which provided ore for 50 years but are now closed.

=== Slovakia ===
Uranium was formerly mined in the Novoveská Huta near Spišská Nová Ves from stratiform deposits. Currently there are plans to open a mine for the extraction of uranium ore in the hills of Jahodna near the city of Košice. European Uranium Resources (earlier known as Tournigan Energy) is planning to mine uranium at the Kuriskova mine, near Košice, however, the plan is strongly opposed by local inhabitants. Several other uranium deposits are found in the Považský Inovec Mts. near Kálnica, in the area of Petrova Hora near Krompachy and in the Vikartovský chrbát in Kozie chrbty Mts. None of them is extracted.

=== Spain ===
The Australian company Berkeley Energia Limited is permitting a new open pit uranium mine at Retortillo in a historical uranium mining area, near the city of Ciudad Rodrigo in Salamanca Province. Berkeley is also active in Cáceres, Barcelona and Guadalajara provinces.

=== Sweden ===
In Sweden, uranium production took place at Ranstadsverket between 1965 and 1969 by mining of alum shale (a kind of oil shale) deposits. The goal was to make Sweden self-supplying with uranium. The high operating costs of the pilot plant (heap leaching) due to the low concentration of uranium in the shale and the availability at that time of comparatively cheap uranium on the world market caused the mine to be closed, although a much cheaper and more efficient leaching process, using sulfur-consuming bacteria, had by then been developed. Since 2005 there have been investigations into opening new uranium mines in Sweden.

=== Ukraine ===
Ukraine's VostGOK produced almost 1,000 tU_{3}O_{8} (2.2 million pounds) from the Zhovti Vody mill in 2007, which was similar to the 2.1 million pounds produced in 2006.

=== United Kingdom ===
The South Terras Mine in Cornwall produced 736 tons of uranium ore from 1873 to 1930.

== North America ==
=== Canada ===
For many years, Canada was the largest exporter of uranium ore; however, in 2009 the top spot was taken over by Kazakhstan. The largest Canadian mines are located in the Athabasca Basin of northern Saskatchewan.

Canada's first uranium discovery was in the Alona Bay area, south of Lake Superior Provincial Park in Ontario, by Dr. John Le Conte in 1847. The Canadian uranium industry, however, really began with the 1932 discovery of pitchblende at Port Radium, Northwest Territories. The deposit was mined from 1933 to 1940, for radium, silver, copper, and cobalt. The mine shut down in 1940, but was reopened in 1942 by Eldorado Mining and Refining Limited to supply uranium to the Manhattan Project. The Canadian government expropriated the Port Radium mine and banned private claimstaking and mining of radioactive minerals.

In 1947, the government lifted the ban on private uranium mining, and the industry boomed through the 1950s, spurred by high prices due to the nuclear weapons programs.

Production peaked in 1959, when 23 mines in five different districts made uranium Canada's number-one export.

That same year, however, the United Kingdom and the United States announced their intention to halt uranium purchases in 1963. By 1963, seven mines were left operating, a number that shrank to only three in 1972.

A price rise caused uranium to boom again in 1975 and 2005.

=== United States ===
Most uranium ore in the United States comes from deposits in sandstone, which tend to be of lower grade than those of Australia and Canada. Because of the lower grade, many uranium deposits in the United States became uneconomic when the price of uranium declined sharply in the 1980s. Today nearly all uranium operations in the United States are in-situ leach.

Regular production of uranium-bearing ore in the United States began in 1898 with the mining of carnotite-bearing sandstones of the Colorado Plateau in Colorado and Utah, for their vanadium content. The discovery of radium by Marie Curie, also in 1898, soon made the ore also valuable for radium. Uranium was a byproduct. By 1913, the Colorado Plateau uranium-vanadium province was supplying about half of the world's supply of radium. Production declined sharply after 1923, when low-cost competition from radium from the Belgian Congo and vanadium from Peru made the Colorado Plateau ores uneconomic.

Mining revived in the 1930s with higher prices for vanadium. American uranium ores were in very high demand by the Manhattan Project during World War II, although the mining companies did not know that the by-product uranium was suddenly valuable. The late 1940s and early 1950s saw a boom in uranium mining in the western US, spurred by the fortunes made by prospectors such as Charlie Steen.

Uranium mining declined with the last open pit mine (Shirley Basin, Wyoming) shutting down in 1992. United States production occurred in the following states (in descending order): New Mexico, Wyoming, Colorado, Utah, Texas, Arizona, Florida, Washington, and South Dakota. The collapse of uranium prices caused all conventional mining to cease by 1992. In-situ leach mining has continued primarily in Wyoming and adjacent Nebraska as well as has recently restarted in Texas. Rising uranium prices since 2003 have increased interest in uranium mining in the United States.

==== Arizona ====
On Wednesday, 25 June 2008, the House Natural Resources Committee voted overwhelmingly to enact emergency protections from uranium mining for 1,000,000 acres (4,000 km^{2}) of public lands around Grand Canyon National Park. This will mean the Secretary of the Interior has an obligation to protect public lands near the Grand Canyon from uranium extraction for three years. The Center for Biological Diversity, Sierra Club, and the Grand Canyon Trust recently won a court order against the Kaibab National Forest stopping uranium drilling near the national park until a thorough environmental analysis is conducted.

The Grand Canyon Watersheds Protection Act has been proposed. This bill would permanently ban uranium mining in the area. The impacts of uranium development have raised concerns of scientists and government officials alike. Due to increasing demand, uranium projects have been on the increase, raising concerns about water, public health, and fragile desert ecosystems.

==== Virginia ====
In February 2010, the Commonwealth of Virginia contracted the National Research Council and Virginia Polytechnic Institute to oversee a National Research Council study of the potential environmental and economic effects of uranium mining in Virginia. The National Research Council study, funded indirectly by a $1.4 million grant from Virginia Uranium to the Commonwealth, resulted in a report released in December 2011. Uranium mining and processing carries with it a range of potential health risks to the people who work in or live near uranium mining and processing facilities. Some of these health risks apply to any type of hard rock mining or other large-scale industrial activity, but others are linked to exposure to radioactive materials. In addition, uranium mining has the potential to impact water, soil, and air quality, with the degree of impact depending on site-specific conditions, how early a contaminant release is detected by monitoring systems, and the effectiveness of mitigation steps.

Some of the worker and public health risks could be mitigated or better controlled through modern internationally accepted best practices, the report says. In addition, if uranium mining, processing, and reclamation were designed, constructed, operated, and monitored according to best practices, near- to moderate-term environmental effects should be substantially reduced, the report found.

However, the report noted that Virginia's high water table and heavy rainfall differed from other parts of the United States—typically dry, Western states—where uranium mining has taken place. Consequently, federal agencies have little experience developing and applying laws and regulations in locations with abundant rainfall and groundwater, such as Virginia. Because of Virginia's moratorium on uranium mining, it has not been necessary for the Commonwealth's agencies to develop a regulatory program that is applicable to uranium mining, processing, and reclamation.

The report also noted the long-term environmental risks of uranium tailings, the solid waste left after processing. Tailings disposal sites represent potential sources of contamination for thousands of years. While it is likely that tailings impoundment sites would be safe for at least 200 years if designed and built according to modern best practices, the long-term risks of radioactive contaminant release are unknown.

The report's authoring committee was not asked to recommend whether uranium mining should be permitted, or to consider the potential benefits to the state were uranium mining to be pursued. It also was not asked to compare the relative risks of uranium mining to the mining of other fuels such as coal.

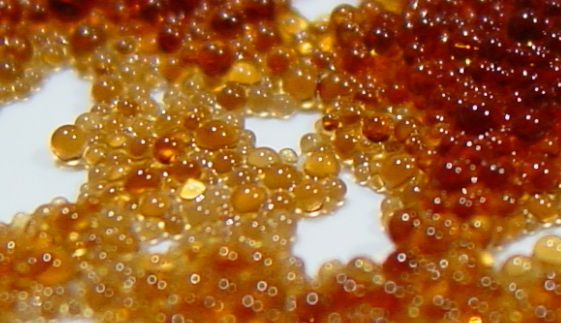
Ion-exchange resin beads

==== Texas ====
Uranium Energy Corp. began in-situ leach mining at its Palangana deposit (grading .135% U_{3}O_{8}) in Duval County in 2010. Uranium-loaded resin beads from that ion-exchange facility are processed into yellowcake at the company's Hobson processing plant, one of only three operating processing plants in the United States. The company has three more South Texas deposits permitted or under development.

- Handbook of Texas Online: Uranium Mining

== South America ==
=== Argentina ===
Blue Sky Uranium Corp. of Canada, together with an Argentinian partner, announced a 2012 exploration program in Rio Negro Province, and Chubut Province. The company's mining concessions cover 500,000 hectares. The near surface resource is believed to be recoverable through conventional open-pit mining. Other Canadian miners, however, have withdrawn from Argentina in the wake of recent legislation, considered to be unfriendly to the industry.

=== Brazil ===
Uranium mining was explored in the 1950s, but was halted by the government due to low quality and little profit.

=== Paraguay ===
Uranium exploration has only recently been undertaken in Paraguay, starting in 2006 by CUE Resources, Ltd. of Canada. Uranium Energy Corporation acquired CUE in 2012. The company's Yuty and Oviedo mining concessions, in the Parana Basin cover 230,650 hectares, roughly 5% of the country. Still in the exploration stage, the resource (grading roughly .05% U_{3}O_{8}) is thought to be favorable for in-situ leach recovery.

== See also ==
- List of countries by uranium production
- List of countries by uranium reserves
