= Uranium in Africa =

Overview of the ore deposits and extraction

Uranium production is an important part of the African economy, with Niger, Namibia and South Africa creating up to 18% of the world's annual production. Many African countries produce uranium or have untapped uranium ore deposits.

== List ==
=== Algeria ===
- Tamanrasset

=== Angola ===
- Cabinda Province

=== Botswana ===
- Mokobaesi - Letlhakane Project - A-Cap Resources

=== Democratic Republic of the Congo ===
- Shinkolobwe (closed 2004)

=== Gabon ===
- Franceville - Mounana - closed
- Franceville - Oklo - closed

=== Namibia ===
- Rössing Namib Desert 65 km from Swakopmund - Rio Tinto
- Langer Heinrich Namib Desert 80 km from Swakopmund - Paladin Energy
- Trekkopje - Areva SA

=== South Africa ===
- Nufcor, subsidiary of Constellation Energy, which is owned by Goldman Sachs
- Brakpan, Gauteng - Mintails project - AngloGold Ashanti's East Rand Gold and Uranium operation (ERGO) gold and uranium joint venture with DRDGold
- First Uranium, listed on the Johannesburg Securities Exchange symbol FIU
- Simmer and Jack Mines, listed on Johannesburg Securities Exchange
- sxrUraniumOne (formerly the JSE-listed Aflease Gold) - Dominion project - gold and uranium

== See also ==
- Aluminium in Africa
- Cement in Africa
- Copper in Africa
- Iron ore in Africa
- Platinum in Africa
- Titanium in Africa
- Economy of Africa
- List of uranium mines
- Uranium market
