= Arandis (disambiguation) =

Arandis is a town in Namibia.

Arandis may also refer to:

- Arandis Constituency, Namibia
- Ourique Municipality, Portugal, formerly Arandis
