= Uranium mining in Namibia =

Namibia has one of the richest uranium mineral reserves in the world. There are currently two large operating mines in the Erongo Region and various exploration projects planned to advance to production in the next few years.

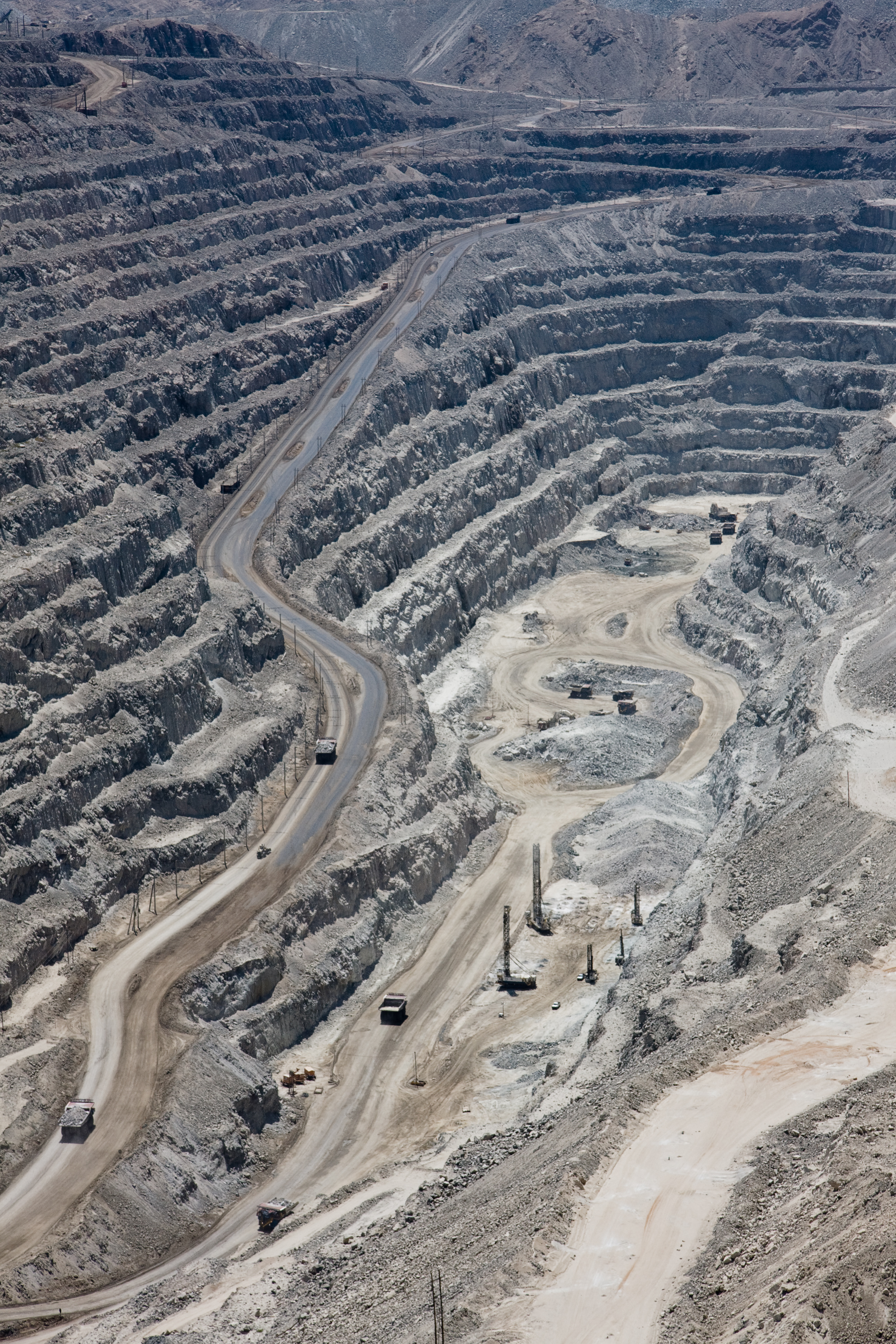
Rössing uranium mine, an open-pit mine near Arandis

Uranium mining in Namibia is of considerable importance to the national economy. In 2020, Namibia produced 11% of uranium worldwide, ranked as the second largest producer, behind Kazakhstan.

Uranium is one of the five mineral resources that were declared "strategic" by the Namibian government in 2011. No new exploration licenses may be granted without involvement of the state-owned mineral exploration company Epangelo Mining.

== Background and history ==
Uranium mineralization was first discovered in the Namibia's Rössing Mountains, Namib Desert in 1928 by Captain G. Peter Louw. Though he tried promoting prospecting, it did not occur for another three decades. In the late 1950s, Anglo America Corporation of South Africa drilled and performed some underground exploration, but because of unstable uranium values and poor economic prospects, the search was abandoned. Uranium exploration was restarted in the country in the following decade, with Rio Tinto obtaining exploration rights for the Rössing deposit in 1966 and starting production in 1976.

The United Nations held special hearings on "The plunder of Namibian uranium" in 1980. Jacob et al. reported in the mid-1980s that the country's uranium mineralization was concentrated in the central zone of the Pan-African Damaran Orogen. In 1999, the International Atomic Energy Agency reported that the only operating mine in the county was the Rössing uranium mine, the largest uranium mine in the world. However, there has been a resurgence in the industry since 2003, and in 2008 uranium mine production in the whole of Africa increased by 16% compared to the previous year. Primary mines have since been opened, including Valencia, Ida Dome, and Goanikontes, as well as two secondary mines, Langer Heinrich (started in 2006) and Trekkopje (started in 2012).

There are two types of Uranium deposits in Namibia: primary uranium mineralization which occurs in granite and secondary uranium mineralization that occurs is calcrete. The necessity for uranium came to be after the COP 26 Convention where many of the member states of the United Nations agreed to reduce their carbon emissions by 2030. The initiative to minimize the carbon emissions led to nuclear energy gaining more validity as an energy source since it does not emit carbon. When large profile organizations such as the International Atomic Energy Agency back nuclear energy as a potential solution to the problems we are facing, construction projects, the amount of investors interested in these projects, and international price points for uranium increased dramatically. Currently nuclear energy provides 10% of the world's electricity and with the Pandemic subsiding, the upwards trajectory of the uranium market is expected to continue.

Namibia is a major destination for Chinese investment in uranium mining. Chinese companies have invested in Namibia's three biggest uranium producers: Husab, Langer Heinrich, and Rössing.

== Namibia's economy relative to uranium mining ==
Namibia is the fourth largest uranium producer in the world and produces a staggering 10% of the world's uranium. The mining industry make up a considerable portion of the Namibian economy, consisting of approximately 10% of its GDP and 50% of its total exports. This suggests that the Namibian economy is susceptible to economic instability if the uranium markets experience decreases in price or demand. This was demonstrated by the economic recession reorts about the vast, natural reserves of uranium in Namibia (7% of the global resources) indicate the mining market may grow since Namibia is considering opening more mines and investing more resources into the extraction of uranium. The depletion of other fossil fuels such as oil, gas, and coal has led to a dramatic increase in the price and demand of uranium on a global level, which has incentivized further pursuit to mine uranium.

== Notable mines ==
=== Rössing ===
The Rössing mine contains the largest uranium deposit in the world associated with an igneous rock. Rössing Uranium is owned by Rio Tinto, the world's largest mining group, which has annual profits of over $1.4 billion. It supplies enriched yellowcake uranium to power stations in France, UK, USA and Japan. The open-cast mine opened in 1976 and at one time faced closure. Rössing Uranium Ltd. processed about 12 million metric tons of ore in 2006 and produced 3,617 tons of uranium oxide (U_{3}O_{8}), and in 2009 they processed 12.6 million tonnes of uranium ore and produced 4150 tonnes of uranium oxide in comparison to 4067 tonnes in the previous year.

=== Langer Heinrich ===
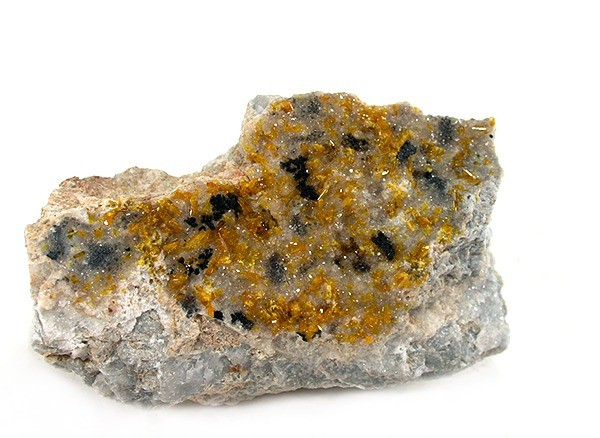
Deposit from the Erongo Region

When it opened in 2006, the Langer Heinrich mine was the first conventional uranium mine to be opened in the world in two decades. Langer Heinrich is now considered to have the greatest potential in the country, and saw a 59% increase to 1225 tons of uranium oxide in 2009, compared with 771 tons in 2008. This mine is under care and maintenance since 2018, awaiting higher uranium prices.

=== Husab ===
Swakop Uranium operate the Husab mine which is expected to be the second largest uranium mine in the world. Another deposit, the Ida Dome mine, is part of this project.

=== Trekkopje ===
The Paris-based multinational corporation Areva Group developed the Trekkopje Mine, but have decided to mothball the project. It is located 70 kilometres (43 mi) of Swakopmund. In 2009, operations were estimated to produce about 100,000 metric tons per day of ore and about 3,000 tons a year of yellowcake. The company has built a desalination plant which is expected to be operating until around 2024.

== Advanced projects ==
=== Tumas ===
Australian-listed company Deep Yellow Limited is currently undertaking a definite feasibility study on the Tumas paleochannel uranium system and is expected to reach its advanced stage at the beginning of 2023. The Tumas project has a total reserve of 122.6 Mlb U_{3}O_{8} at 232 ppm. In April 2025, Deep Yellow decided to defer the construction of the full-scale process plant until the uranium price improved, though early infrastructure development would continue.

=== Norasa ===
Forsys Metals Corporation of Canada is developing the Valencia and Namibplaas uranium deposits, 40 km north of the Langer Heinrich mine. The company was granted a 25-year mining license in 2008 and, in 2009, announced the completion of an independent mineral resource study for the Valencia deposit. Total Proven and Probable Reserves (2015) were estimated as 206 million tonnes of ore with average grade of 200 ppm (0.02%) uranium oxide (U_{3}O_{8}) for 90.6 million pounds of U_{3}O_{8}.

=== Etango ===
Bannerman Energy owns and operates the Etango project, which is located 30 kilometres (19 mi) southwest of the Rossing Mine, and 30 kilometres (19 mi) southeast of Swakopmund. Etango is considered to have the largest unexploited uranium resource in the world. A heap leach demonstration pilot plant operated from 2015 to 2020. In 2021 feasibility studies were ongoing for a conventional open pit mining and heap leach processing operation.

=== Others ===
- Aussinanis mine
- Marenica mine

== Mining laws in Namibia ==
As the uranium industry grows in Namibia, the laws pertaining to the oversight and regulation of uranium must also be modified to accommodate this change. The minerals and prospecting Act of 1992 does not distinguish between the mining of uranium compared to other types of minerals despite the atomic potential of uranium which could lead to security concerns. Currently, the exploration of potential mining sites and the extraction of uranium cannot take place without the approval of the minister (leader of the Ministry of Mines and Energy) and current practices do not meet the International Atomic Uranium Agency's standards for extraction. The exports laws are also included under this act. Nuclear power is a costly form of energy, the operating costs of waste disposal of nuclear waste are problematic factors that need to be considered when increasing uranium extraction. These laws must ensure uranium mining's validity while taking into account how the waste produced is disposed of properly with necessary precautions being taken.

== Safety hazards associated with mining uranium ==
The process of mining uranium is a dangerous process and can lead to adverse health effects for the miners involved. Uranium is often near to a variety of radio-nuclides such as radium, radon, thorium, and others. Radon gas can cause lung cancer and a number of other respiratory illnesses that can worsen as a result of prolonged exposure. This gas can also affect nearby residents meaning this issue can impact the health of innocent people you have no affiliation with these projects. Radon gas and contamination can also cause cancer, birth defects, increase infant mortality, and cause various lung, eye, and skin related illnesses. When digging into the ground to extract precious minerals, mines produce excess rock called tailings. The rock that does not contain uranium must be processed which can result in uranium leaking into the groundwater and contaminating the groundwater which can lead to health concerns similar to the air pollution specified earlier.

== Environmental implications ==
The environmental impact of uranium mining in Namibia has raised concerns amongst environmentalists, especially as many mining activities are conducted within the Namib-Naukluft National Park. The highly acidic tailings dams found at Namibia's uranium mines are an environmental concern. Monitoring activities include: air, water, and dust quality; biodiversity; medical surveillance; occupational hazards; and radiation protection.

=== Water Contamination ===
Milling is the process of separating the rock from the uranium. The rock is reduced to small particles and then those particles are mixed with water. This creates a slurry; when the slurry is mixed with a solution such as sulfuric acid, the uranium is separated from the rock. The remaining slurry is then discarded, and discarding of these tailings contaminates the surrounding environment, including the water. The tailings are still radioactive and when discarded are absorbed into the ground which infuses with the groundwater and surface water. The water is now no longer safe for use. Explosives used for mining also create clouds of uranium dust, which settles in nearby fields and waterways. Extreme levels of uranium were detected in 80% of the groundwater taken for study and uranium concentration in the water is above 15 times the WHO limit.

== Sustainable development goals of the uranium market ==
The National Development plans are the templates that dictate how uranium mining in Namibia can more effectively achieve their Sustainable Development Goals within a specified time span. There are five of these plans in total to date. The fifth National Development Plan of Namibia specifies how the mining projects can better achieve economic progression, social transformation, environmental sustainability, and good governance over the course of 2017–2022. This plan operates in tandem with the African Union Agenda 2063 (a plan that details how Africa can use its natural resources to further the continent and improve the quality of life) to help all Africans and not just Namibia exclusively. Namibia has been very proactive and cooperative when it comes to the Sustainable Development Goals introduced in 2015, and uranium mining may positively effect all of these goals if the expansion of the market is done carefully. This plan analyzes important metrics such as demographic data, poverty rates, human development indexes, environmental resilience, and governance scores in an attempt to quantify progress and identify weak areas that need to improve.

== See also ==
- Mining in Namibia
