= Platinum in Africa =

Overview of ore deposits and extraction

Platinum and platinum group metals are produced in Zimbabwe and South Africa. Of the multitudes of companies involved in producing platinum group metals in these two countries, these are the principal operators:

== South Africa ==
World's leading platinum producer.

- Anglo Platinum – Anglo American plc
- Impala Platinum – Implats
- Lonplats
- Aquarius Platinum
- African Rainbow Minerals

== Zimbabwe ==
- Zimbabwe Platinum – Zimplats
- Impala Platinum
- Anglo American Platinum Company

== Platinum group elements ==
There are 6 platinum group elements:

- Iridium
- Osmium
- Palladium
- Platinum
- Rhodium
- Ruthenium

== See also ==
- Aluminium in Africa
- Copper in Africa
- Iron ore in Africa
- Mining
- Platinum group
- Platinum group: sources
- Titanium in Africa
- Uranium in Africa
