= Aluminium in Africa =

Overview of ore deposits and extraction

Aluminium in Africa originates from bauxite, and within Africa is primarily found in Guinea, Mozambique and Ghana. Guinea is by far the biggest producer in Africa, and is a world leader in bauxite production.

There are many companies involved in the aluminium trade in Africa. Principal mine and smelter operators include Cameroon, Ghana, Guinea and among others

== Bauxite deposits and extraction ==
Africa is rich in bauxite reserves, which are used as the primary raw material in the production of aluminum. Countries with significant bauxite reserves include Guinea, Ghana, Sierra Leone, and Guinea-Bissau. Bauxite mining entails extracting the ore from the ground, followed by refining operations to produce alumina, which is then smelted to produce aluminum.

== Economic significance ==
The African aluminum sector offers economic potential. Bauxite extraction and processing contribute to job creation and income production in local areas. Furthermore, the development of aluminum smelters and downstream sectors encourages industrialization by attracting foreign direct investment and transferring knowledge. These investments not only help local economies but also promote infrastructure development, skill development, and industrial sector diversification.

== Export and trade ==
The production of aluminum in Africa contributes to the global supply chain and export market. Aluminium is exported in a variety of forms, including ingots, billets, sheets, and extrusions, to fulfill both regional and international demand. African countries can earn foreign currency, improve their trade balance, and promote economic integration with other regions by participating in global commerce.

== Environmental considerations ==
While the aluminum sector provides economic benefits, environmental concerns linked with its extraction and processing must be addressed. Mining activities must be carried out in an environmentally responsible manner, avoiding ecological harm and guaranteeing effective post-mining land rehabilitation. Additionally, efforts should be undertaken across the aluminum production chain to improve energy efficiency and reduce greenhouse gas emissions.

== Collaboration and sustainable development ==
Promoting collaboration among African countries and foreign partners is critical for the aluminum industry's long-term development. Sharing best practices, technical breakthroughs, and research discoveries can result in increased efficiency, lower environmental impact, and increased value addition within the industry. Collaboration also allows African countries to establish fair trade agreements, stimulate responsible investment, and ensure equitable benefit sharing among stakeholders.

== Principal mine and smelter operators ==
=== Cameroon ===
- Ngaoundéré - railhead
- Minim, Martap - Canyon Resources
- Edéa - refinery

=== Ghana ===
- Ghana Bauxite, affiliated with Alcan
- Volta Aluminum Company (Valco)

=== Guinea ===
- Rio Tinto Alcan
- Compagnie des Bauxites de Guinée (CBG) - in the Boké Region - Guinea's largest producer, affiliated with Halco Mining, which is affiliated with Alcan, Alcoa, Reynolds Metals, Pechiney, Comalco, etc.
- Alumina Company of Guinea, ACG - operating the Friguia bauxite-alumina complex at Fria
- Societé des Bauxites de Kindia SBK - state-owned, operates the Kindia mining operations; operated by Rusal (Russia Aluminium) and exports bauxite to Ukraine
- Global Alumina Products Corporation, proposed smelting operation in Conakry
- Kinia - refinery
- Sangaredi
- There are over 100 Guinean aluminium companies listed at MBendi's Bauxite:Africa:Guinea information page.

=== Mozambique ===
- Mozal - Mozambique aluminium

=== South Africa ===
- South Africa does not mine bauxite nor refine alumina; BHP operates two smelters at Richards Bay in Kwazulu Natal.

== See also ==
- Mining
- Copper in Africa
- Iron ore in Africa
- Platinum in Africa
- Titanium in Africa
- Uranium in Africa
- List of Alumina Refineries
