= FCU =

FCU may refer to:

== Organisations ==
- Fission Uranium Corp. (TSX code: FCU), a Canadian mining company

=== Education ===
- Feng Chia University, in Taichung, Taiwan
- Filamer Christian University, in Roxas, Capiz, Philippines
- Fukien Christian University, now Fujian Normal University, in Fujian, China
- Fukuyama City University, in Hiroshima, Japan

=== Finance ===
- Federal credit union, in the US
- Florida Credit Union, an American financial institution
- Foreign & Colonial Eurotrust, a British investment trust

=== Football clubs ===
- FC Uijeongbu, South Korea
- FC Ultramarina, Cape Verde
- F.C. United of Manchester, England
- FC Unterföhring, Germany
- 1. FC Union Berlin, Germany
- FC Utrecht, the Netherlands

== Science and technology ==
- Fan coil unit, in HVAC systems
- Flexor carpi ulnaris muscle, in the forearm
- Fuel control unit, in gas turbine engines
- Fused connection unit, the name for a permanent wiring outlet in electrical wiring in the United Kingdom

== Other uses ==
- Flight Control Unit, basically the Autopilot in Aviation
- Fact Checkers Unit, an American comedy series
- Ferrovia Centrale Umbra, a railway line in Italy
