= Omahola project =

Uranium mine in Namibia

Ongalo
- Location: Erongo Region, Namibia
- Products: uranium

The Omahola project consists of several uraniferous magnetite deposits (Ongolo, Inca, MS7) located in the western part of Namibia in Erongo Region, in the Alaskite Alley. Ongalo represents a uranium resource having estimated 17,400 tU in ore grading 0.036% uranium, or 125.4 million pounds in uranium oxide.

The Omahola project shares the same veins as the Rössing and Husab mines. A regional mining project was planned in the early 2010s to operate massive uranium extraction and refining, but the 2011 Fukushima nuclear accident put an end to this global project. Deep Yellow continued to probe the land, publishing new data on the Omahola project in 2021 (combined resource of 43,800 tonnes of uranium grading 0.016% uranium at a 100 ppm cut-off), making it a key long-term growth project.
