= Arandis Airport =

Airport in Erongo, Namibia

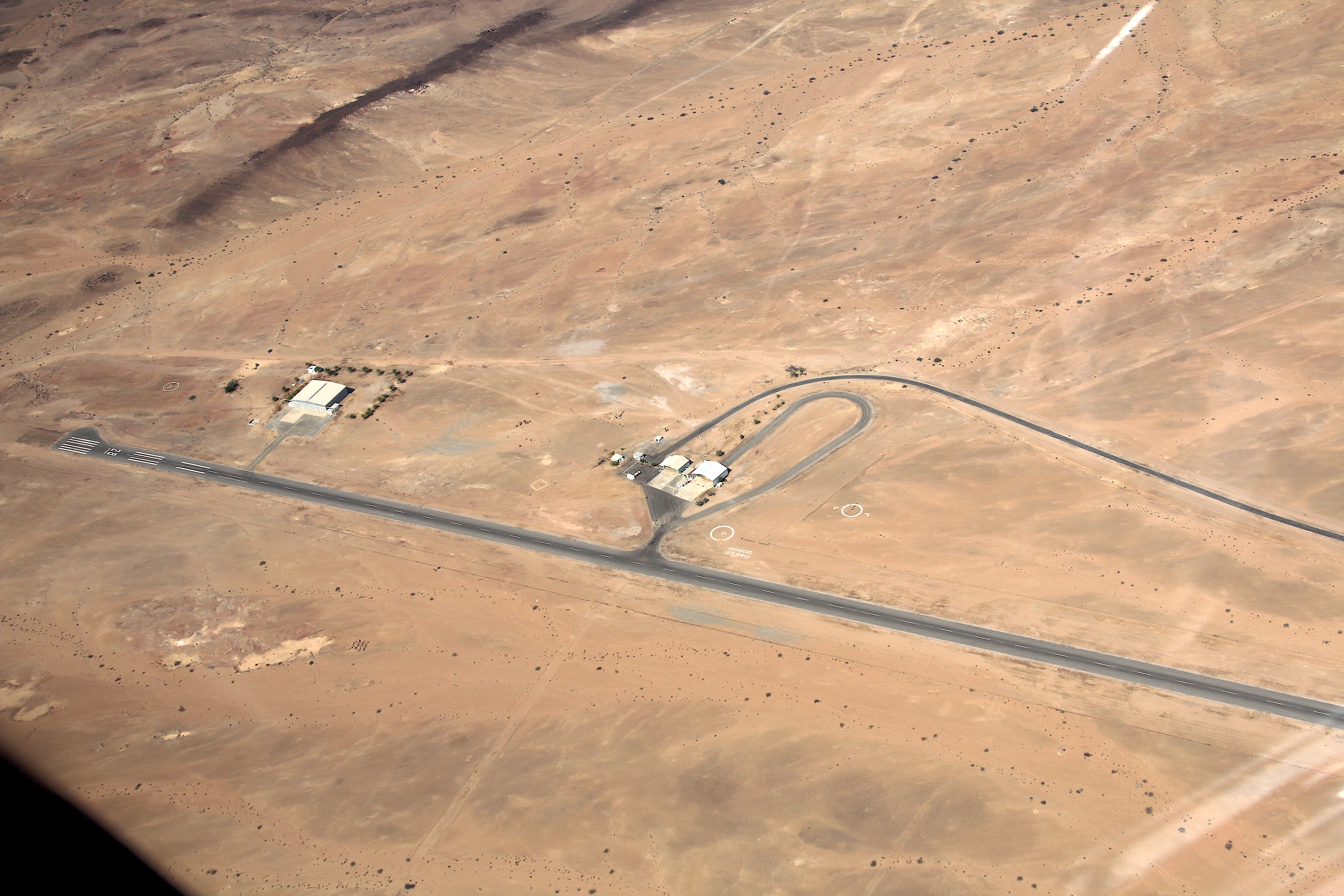
- IATA: ADI; ICAO: FYAR

Summary
- Airport type: Public
- Serves: Arandis, Namibia
- Elevation AMSL: 1,905 ft (581 m)
- Coordinates: 22°27′44″S 14°58′48″E

Map
- Location of airport in Namibia

Runways
Direction	Length		Surface
Direction	m	ft	Surface
10/28	1,920	6,299	Asphalt
- Source: WAD GCM Google Maps

Arandis Airport (IATA: ADI, ICAO: FYAR) is an airport serving Arandis, a town in the Erongo Region of Namibia. The airport is 5 kilometres (3.1 mi) south of Arandis. The town and airport also provide service to the Rössing Uranium Mine, one of the world's largest open-pit uranium mines.

The Arandis non-directional beacon (Ident: AD) is located 0.9 nautical miles (1.7 km) off the threshold of Runway 10.

== See also ==
- List of airports in Namibia
- Transport in Namibia
