= Nuclear energy in Namibia =

Nuclear energy in Namibia is a topic of geopolitical interest but is currently not an infrastructure concern. There are no nuclear power plants in Namibia. There is potential interest in the country's nuclear power capacities, as Namibia is the world's fourth-largest uranium producer.

== Uranium mining ==
Regional uranium is mined by Rio Tinto and Paladin Energy. Records indicate that Namibia produced 4,626 tons of uranium in 2009, cementing its status as the world's fourth-largest uranium extractor, according to the World Nuclear Association.

The central government previously placed a moratorium on issuing uranium exploration licences in 2007, largely due to the absence of a concrete nuclear energy policy. However, major foreign contractors currently hold uranium mining licences, with two mines operational and two new mines undergoing construction. One of these developments is spearheaded by French energy giant Areva, with operations projected to open in 2013. Namibia's uranium deposits are of growing interest to major economies, with France, Russia and other countries reconsidering their own nuclear power policies.

Areva Trekkopje, a subsidiary of Areva, project in 2010 received its Export Processing Zone (EPZ) license for a period of five years after Areva reportedly agreed to develop a feasibility study on generating nuclear power in Namibia. Areva said it's not only focusing to provide energy to Namibia but also to other countries. The government had reconsidered to grant Areva a license to develop a nuclear power plant in Namibia after its first application was decline in the year 2007.

== Nuclear power ==
The Namibian government has considered the development of nuclear power in order to complete the national energy mix and provide sufficient energy for national development. The idea of generating its own nuclear power started in 2008 with a goal of being up and running by the year 2018. In 2012 the government predicted the estimated cost for the whole project to be 17 billion.

Namibia's nuclear efforts in getting nuclear power have concerned the attention of the global non-proliferation community. The White House Global Threat Reduction Initiative (GTRI) expressed concern that Namibian uranium might fall into the wrong hands.
