= Asser Kuveri Kapere =

Namibian politician (born 1951)

Personal details
- Born: 11 June 1951 (age 74)
- Children: late Mandela Kapere

Asser Kuveri Kapere (born 11 June 1951) is a Namibian politician. He is a member of SWAPO and was the Chairman of the National Council of Namibia from December 2004 to December 2015.

== Career ==
Kapere was born in the small town of Omaruru in the Erongo Region of Namibia. He worked as a teacher at St. Theresa Secondary School in Tses from 1974 to 1975 and joined SWAPO in 1975. He was Chairperson of SWAPO's Arandis Branch from 1980 to 1982 and SWAPO's Chairperson for the Western Region from 1983 to 1990. He also became a member of the SWAPO Regional Executive Committee for Erongo Region in 1983 and was President of the Mineworkers Union of Namibia from 1987 to 1991.

He has served in several political positions and offices in Namibia following independence, including Commissioner of the Western Region (1990–1992) and Governor of the Erongo Region (1992–1999); he has also been the Regional Councillor for the Arandis Constituency since 1992. He became Vice-President of the Association of Regional Councils (ARC) in 1997, then President of ARC in 1999. He was first elected to the National Council as a member from Erongo Region in 1999, and he subsequently served in the Cabinet as Deputy Minister for Works, Transport and Communication from 2002 to 2004. He then became Chairman of the National Council on December 16, 2004.

Asser Kapere was first elected to the SWAPO Central Committee in 1997. He is a board member of the Democracy Support Center that was formed in July 2006. At the November 2007 SWAPO Party Congress, Kapere was re-elected as a member of the Politburo.
