= Nuclear engineering =

Applied science

Nuclear engineering is the engineering discipline concerned with designing and applying systems that utilize the energy released by nuclear processes. Furthermore, it is a declination of nucleonics, which is the application of nuclear physics to engineering (whence nuclear engineering) and other sciences (e.g., astrophysics and geophysics).

The most prominent application of nuclear engineering is the generation of electricity. Worldwide, some 439 nuclear reactors in 31 countries generate 10 percent of the world's energy through nuclear fission. In the future, it is expected that nuclear fusion will add another nuclear means of generating energy. Both reactions make use of the nuclear binding energy released when atomic nucleons are either separated (fission) or brought together (fusion). The energy available is given by the binding energy curve, and the amount generated is much greater than that generated through chemical reactions. Fission of 1 gram of uranium yields as much energy as burning 3 tons of coal or 600 gallons of fuel oil, without adding carbon dioxide to the atmosphere.

== History ==
Nuclear engineering was born in 1938, with the discovery of nuclear fission. The first artificial nuclear reactor, CP-1, was designed by a team of physicists who were concerned that Nazi Germany might also be seeking to build a bomb based on nuclear fission. (The earliest known nuclear reaction on Earth occurred naturally, 1.7 billion years ago, in Oklo, Gabon, Africa.) The second artificial nuclear reactor, the X-10 Graphite Reactor, was also a part of the Manhattan Project, as were the plutonium-producing reactors of the Hanford Engineer Works.

The first nuclear reactor to generate electricity was Experimental Breeder Reactor I (EBR-I), which did so near Arco, Idaho, in 1951 on December 20. EBR-I was a standalone facility, not connected to a grid, but a later Idaho research reactor in the BORAX series did briefly supply power to the town of Arco in 1955.

The first commercial nuclear power plant, built to be connected to an electrical grid, is the Obninsk Nuclear Power Plant, which began operation in 1954. The second is the Shippingport Atomic Power Station, which produced electricity in 1957.

For a chronology, from the discovery of uranium to the current era, see Outline History of Nuclear Energy or History of Nuclear Power. Also see History of Nuclear Engineering Part 1: Radioactivity, Part 2: Building the Bomb, and Part 3: Atoms for Peace.

See List of Commercial Nuclear Reactors for a comprehensive listing of nuclear power reactors and IAEA Power Reactor Information System (PRIS) for worldwide and country-level statistics on nuclear power generation.

== Sub-disciplines ==
Nuclear engineers work in such areas as the following:

- Nuclear reactor design, which has evolved from the Generation I, proof-of concept, reactors of the 1950s and 1960s, to Generation II, Generation III, and Generation IV concepts
- Nuclear reactor physics, which deals with the applied study and engineering applications of neutron diffusion and fission chain reaction to induce a controlled fission rate in a nuclear reactor for energy production
- Thermal hydraulics and heat transfer. In a typical nuclear power plant, heat generates steam that drives a steam turbine and an electric generator that produces electricity
- Materials science as it relates to nuclear power applications
- Managing the nuclear fuel cycle, in which fissile material is obtained, formed into fuel, removed when depleted, and safely stored or reprocessed
- Nuclear propulsion, mainly for military naval vessels, but there have been concepts for aircraft and missiles. Nuclear power has been used in space since the 1960s
- Plasma physics, which is integral to the development of fusion power
- Weapons development and management
- Generation of radionuclides, which have applications in industry, medicine, and many other areas
- Nuclear waste management
- Health physics
- Nuclear medicine and Medical Physics
- Nuclear criticality safety
- Health and safety
- Instrumentation and control engineering
- Process engineering
- Project Management
- Quality engineering
- Reactor operations
- Nuclear security (detection of clandestine nuclear materials)
- Nuclear engineering even has a role in criminal investigation, and agriculture.

Many chemical, electrical and mechanical and other types of engineers also work in the nuclear industry, as do many scientists and support staff. In the U.S., nearly 100,000 people directly work in the nuclear industry. Including secondary sector jobs, the number of people supported by the U.S. nuclear industry is 475,000.

== Employment ==
In the United States, nuclear engineers are employed as follows:

- Electric power generation 25%
- Federal government 18%
- Scientific research and development 15%
- Engineering services 5%
- Manufacturing 10%
- Other areas 27%

Job prospects for nuclear engineers worldwide are not available, but the IAEA estimates that nuclear energy capacity will grow by 40% (an additional 514 GW(e)) to 2.5 times current capacity (an additional 950 GW(e)) by 2050. Countries with existing nuclear energy capacity and those actively exploring nuclear energy are listed in the following.

| Country | Nuclear capabilities |
|---|---|
| Algeria | See Emerging Nuclear Energy Countries. |
| Argentina | See Nuclear Power in Argentina. |
| Armenia | See Nuclear Power in Armenia. |
| Australia | See nuclear sector and Australia's Uranium. |
| Austria | "Austria operates one central radioactive waste management and interim storage facility – Nuclear Engineering Seibersdorf GmbH (NES) for pre-disposal management including treatment, conditioning and interim storage of low- and intermediate level radioactive waste (LILW)." Nuclear Engineering Seibersdorf GmbH (NES) collects, processes, conditions, and stores radioactive waste and does decontamination and decommissioning of nuclear facilities for the Republic of Austria. |
| Azerbaijan | See Emerging Nuclear Energy Countries. |
| Bangladesh | See WNA:Bangladesh and Nuclear Power in Bangladesh. |
| Belarus | See WNA:Belarus and Nuclear Power in Belarus. |
| Belgium | See Nuclear Power in Belgium and nuclear sector. |
| Bolivia | See Emerging Nuclear Energy Countries. |
| Botswana | See WNA: Uranium in Africa and Uranium in Africa. |
| Brazil | See nuclear sector and Nuclear activities in Brazil. |
| Bulgaria | See nuclear sector and Nuclear Power in Bulgaria. |
| Burundi | See Emerging Nuclear Energy Countries. |
| Cambodia | See Emerging Nuclear Energy Countries. |
| Canada | WNA: Nuclear Power in Canada, nuclear sector, and Nuclear Power in Canada. |
| Central African Republic | See WNA: Uranium in Africa and Uranium in Africa. |
| Chile | See Emerging Nuclear Energy Countries. |
| China | See WNA:Nuclear Power in China, and Nuclear Power in China. |
| Congo, Democratic Republic | See WNA: Uranium in Africa and Uranium in Africa. |
| Croatia | See WNA:Nuclear Power in Slovenia and Nuclear Power in Croatia. |
| Czech Republic | See WNA: Nuclear Power in Czech Republic and Nuclear Power in the Czech Republic. |
| Cuba | See Emerging Nuclear Energy Countries. |
| Denmark | See WNA:Nuclear Energy in Denmark and Nuclear Power in Denmark. |
| Ecuador | See Emerging Nuclear Energy Countries. |
| Egypt | See Start of construction of Egypt's first nuclear power plant and El Dabaa Nuclear Power Plant. |
| Equatorial Guinea | See WNA: Uranium in Africa and Uranium in Africa. |
| Estonia | See Emerging Nuclear Energy Countries. |
| Ethiopia | See Emerging Nuclear Energy Countries. |
| Finland | See WPA:Nuclear Power in Finland and Nuclear Power in Finland. |
| France | See WPA:Nuclear Power in France and Nuclear Power in France. |
| Gabon | See WNA: Uranium in Africa and Uranium in Africa. |
| Georgia | See Emerging Nuclear Energy Countries. |
| Germany | See WPA:Nuclear Power in Germany and Nuclear Power in Germany. |
| Ghana | See Emerging Nuclear Energy Countries. |
| Greece | See Emerging Nuclear Energy Countries. |
| Guinea | See WNA: Uranium in Africa and Uranium in Africa |
| Guyana | See Emerging Nuclear Energy Countries. |
| Hungary | See WNA:Nuclear Power in Hungary and Nuclear Power in Hungary. |
| India | See WNA:Nuclear Power in India and Nuclear Power in India. |
| Indonesia | See WNPA:Nuclear Power in Indonesia and Nuclear Power in Indonesia. |
| Iran | See WNA:Nuclear Power in Iran and Nuclear Power in Iran. |
| Israel | See Emerging Nuclear Energy Countries. |
| Italy | See WNA:Nuclear Power in Italy and Nuclear Power in Italy. |
| Japan | See WNA:Nuclear Power in Japan and Nuclear Power in Japan. |
| Jordan | See WNA:Nuclear Power in Jordan and Nuclear Power in Jordan. |
| Kazakhstan | See WNA:Uranium and Nuclear Power in Kazakhstan and Nuclear Power in Kazakhstan. |
| Kenya | See Emerging Nuclear Energy Countries. |
| Korea, North | See Nuclear power in North Korea. |
| Korea, South | See WNA:Nuclear Power in South Korea and Nuclear Power in South Korea. |
| Kyrgyzstan | See WNA:Uranium in Kyrgyzstan. |
| Laos | See Emerging Nuclear Energy Countries. |
| Latvia | See Emerging Nuclear Energy Countries. |
| Lithuania | See WNA:Nuclear Power in Lithuania and Nuclear Power in Lithuania. |
| Malawi | See WNA: Uranium in Africa and Uranium in Africa. |
| Malaysia | See Emerging Nuclear Energy Countries. |
| Mali | See Emerging Nuclear Energy Countries. |
| Mauritania | See Emerging Nuclear Energy Countries. |
| Mexico | See WNA:Nuclear Power in Mexico and Nuclear Power in Mexico. |
| Mongolia | See WNA:Uranium in Mongolia. |
| Morocco | See WNA: Uranium in Africa and Uranium in Africa. |
| Myanmar | See Emerging Nuclear Energy Countries. |
| Namibia | See WNA:Uranium in Namibia. |
| Netherlands | See WNA:Nuclear Power in the Netherlands and Nuclear Power in the Netherlands. |
| New Zealand | See WNA:Nuclear Energy Prospects in New Zealand. |
| Niger | See WNA:Uranium in Niger. |
| Nigeria | See Emerging Nuclear Energy Countries. |
| Norway | See Nuclear power in Norway. |
| Oman | See Emerging Nuclear Energy Countries. |
| Pakistan | See WNA:Nuclear Power in Pakistan and Nuclear Power in Pakistan. |
| Paraguay | See Emerging Nuclear Energy Countries. |
| Peru | See Emerging Nuclear Energy Countries. |
| Philippines | See Emerging Nuclear Energy Countries. |
| Poland | See WNA:Nuclear Power in Poland and Nuclear Power in Poland. |
| Romania | See WNA:Nuclear Power in Romania and Nuclear Power in Romania. |
| Russia | See WNA:Nuclear Power in Russia and Nuclear Power in Russia. |
| Rwanda | See Emerging Nuclear Energy Countries. |
| Saudi Arabia | See WNA:Nuclear Power in Saudi Arabia and Nuclear Power in Saudi Arabia. |
| Senegal | See WNA: Uranium in Africa and Uranium in Africa. |
| Serbia | See Emerging Nuclear Energy Countries. |
| Singapore | See Singapore is considering the nuclear option for its energy transition... again. |
| Slovakia | See WNA:Nuclear Power in Slovakia and Nuclear Power in Slovakia. |
| Slovenia | See WNA:Nuclear Power in Slovenia and Nuclear Power in Slovenia. |
| South Africa | See WNA:Nuclear Power in South Africa and Nuclear Power in South Africa. |
| Spain | See WNA:Nuclear Power in Spain and Nuclear Power in Spain. |
| Sri Lanka | See Emerging Nuclear Energy Countries. |
| Sudan | See Emerging Nuclear Energy Countries. |
| Sweden | See WNA:Nuclear Power in Sweden and Nuclear Power in Sweden. |
| Switzerland | See WNA:Nuclear Power in Switzerland and Nuclear Power in Switzerland. |
| Syria | See Emerging Nuclear Energy Countries. |
| Taiwan | See WNA:Nuclear Power in Taiwan and Nuclear Power in Taiwan. |
| Tajikistan | See WNA:Uranium in Tajikistan. |
| Tanzania | See WNA:Uranium in Africa. |
| Thailand | See Emerging Nuclear Energy Countries. |
| Tunisia | See Emerging Nuclear Energy Countries. |
| Turkey | See WNA:Nuclear Power in Turkey and Nuclear Power in Turkey. |
| Uganda | See Emerging Nuclear Energy Countries. |
| Ukraine | See WNA:Nuclear Power in Ukraine and Nuclear Power in Ukraine |
| United Arab Emirates | See WNA:Nuclear Power in the United Arab Emirates and Nuclear Power in the United Arab Emirates. |
| United Kingdom | See WNA:Nuclear Power in the United Kingdom and Nuclear Power in the United Kingdom. |
| United States | See WNA:Nuclear Power in the USA and Nuclear Power in the USA. |
| Uzbekistan | See WNA:Uranium in Uzbekistan. |
| Venezuela | See Emerging Nuclear Energy Countries. |
| Vietnam | See WNA:Nuclear Power in Vietnam and Nuclear Power in Vietnam. |
| Yemen | See Emerging Nuclear Energy Countries. |
| Zambia | See Emerging Nuclear Energy Countries. |
| Zimbabwe | See WNA:Uranium in Africa. |

== Education ==
Organizations that provide study and training in nuclear engineering include the following:

| Region/Country | Schools and Training |
|---|---|
| Africa | The IAEA has 45 Member States in Africa. "The IAEA's technical cooperation (TC) programme is the main mechanism for assisting Member States in the peaceful, safe and secure application of nuclear science and technology." Education in nuclear and radiation safety is a component. |
| Argentina | |
| Armenia | IAEA Technical Communication Program. |
| Asia | Asian Network for Education in Nuclear Technology (ANENT). |
| Australia | UNSW Nuclear Engineering. |
| Austria | EU Science Hub. |
| Bangladesh | University of Dhaka. |
| Belarus | Belarusian State University. |
| Belgium | EU Science Hub. |
| Brazil | COPPE UFRJ. |
| Brunei | See https://www-pub.iaea.org/mtcd/publications/pdf/pub1626web-52229977.pdf |
| Bulgaria | EU Science Hub. |
| Cambodia | See https://www.khmertimeskh.com/50896212/pride-of-cambodia-students-graduate-with-degrees-in-civil-nuclear-science/. |
| Canada | See Canadian-Universities.net. |
| Chile | |
| China | Harbin Engineering University and Harbin Engineering University. North China Electric Power University and North China Electric Power University. Tsinghua University and Tsinghua University. |
| Croatia | EU Science Hub. |
| Cyprus | EU Science Hub. |
| Czech Republic | EU Science Hub. |
| Denmark | EU Science Hub. |
| Estonia | EU Science Hub. |
| Finland | EU Science Hub. |
| France | EU Science Hub. |
| Germany | EU Science Hub. |
| Greece | EU Science Hub. |
| Hungary | EU Science Hub. |
| IAEA | STAR-NET: Regional Network for Education and Training in Nuclear Technology, https://www.star-net.online/en/?page_id=16, universities: National Polytechnic University of Armenia Republic of Armenia Baku State University, Republic of Azerbaijan Belarusian State University of Informatics and Radioelectronics, Republic of Belarus Belarusian National Technical University, Republic of Belarus Belarusian State University, Republic of Belarus L.N. Gumilev Eurasian National University, Republic of Kazakhstan Sarsen Amanzholov East Kazakhstan State University, Republic of Kazakhstan D. Serikbayev East Kazakhstan Technical University (EKTU), Republic of Kazakhstan AGH University of Science and Technology (Akademia Górniczo-Hutnicza im. Stanisława Staszica w Krakowie), Republic of Poland National Research Nuclear University «MEPhI», Russian Federation Nizhny Novgorod State Technical University n.a. R.E. Alekseev, Russian Federation The National Research Tomsk Polytechnic University, Russian Federation Odessa National Polytechnic University (OPNU), Ukraine Samarkand State University, Republic of Uzbekistan The IAEA also provides guidance for nuclear engineering curricula: https://www-pub.iaea.org/mtcd/publications/pdf/pub1626web-52229977.pdf |
| India | https://www.iitk.ac.in/net/ and IIT Kanpur. |
| Indonesia | See https://tf.ugm.ac.id/2014/04/19/developing-nuclear-education-in-indonesia/ |
| Iran | 13 atomic energy primary schools /high schools, more schools being built,Isfahan University of Technology, See https://www.nti.org/education-center/facilities/amir-kabir-university-of-technology-2/ |
| Ireland | EU Science Hub. |
| Israel | See https://in.bgu.ac.il/en/engn/nuclear/Pages/default.aspx |
| Italy | EU Science Hub. |
| Japan | https://www.ne.t.kyoto-u.ac.jp/en https://www.nuclear.sci.waseda.ac.jp/index_en.html |
| Jordan | https://www.just.edu.jo/FacultiesandDepartments/FacultyofEngineering/Departments/NuclearEngineering/Pages/Nuclear%20Engineering.aspx |
| Latin America | Latin American Network for Education in Nuclear Technology (LANENT) https://www.iaea.org/services/networks/lanent |
| Latvia | EU Science Hub. |
| Lithuania | EU Science Hub. |
| Luxembourg | EU Science Hub. |
| Malaysia | Universiti Teknologi Malaysia |
| Malta | EU Science Hub. |
| Mexico | https://inis.iaea.org/collection/NCLCollectionStore/_Public/41/133/41133846.pdf |
| Netherlands | EU Science Hub. |
| New Zealand | https://www.auckland.ac.nz/ |
| Norway | https://www.ntnu.edu/ |
| Pakistan | National University of Pakistan |
| Philippines | https://ansn.iaea.org/Common/topics/OpenTopic.aspx?ID=13280 |
| Poland | EU Science Hub. |
| Portugal | EU Science Hub. |
| Romania | EU Science Hub. |
| Russia | National Research Nuclear University MEPhI (Moscow Engineering Physics Institute) https://tpu.ru/en/about/department_links_and_administration/department/view/?id=7863 |
| Saudi Arabia | https://ne.kau.edu.sa/Default-135008-EN |
| Serbia | https://www.bg.ac.rs/en/members/institutes/Vinca.php |
| Slovakia | EU Science Hub. |
| Slovenia | EU Science Hub. |
| South Korea | TBA |
| Spain | EU Science Hub. |
| Sweden | EU Science Hub. |
| Switzerland | https://ethz.ch/en/studies/master/degree-programmes/engineering-sciences/nuclear-engineering.html |
| Taiwan | https://www.studyintaiwan.org/university/program/2565 |
| Thailand | https://www.eng.chula.ac.th/en/department/department-of-nuclear-technology |
| Turkey | https://nuke.hacettepe.edu.tr/en/department-69 http://nukbilimler.ankara.edu.tr/en/nuclear-research-and-technologies-department/ http://www.nuce.boun.edu.tr/ |
| Ukraine | https://www.uatom.org/en/training-of-nuclear-specialists |
| United Arab Emirates | https://www.ku.ac.ae/academics/college-of-engineering/department/department-of-nuclear-engineering#about |
| United Kingdom | University of Birmingham University of Bristol University of Cambridge University of Central Lancashire University of Cumbria Defence Academy of the United Kingdom University of Dundee Imperial College London Lancaster University University of Leeds University of Liverpool The University of Manchester Nottingham Trent University Nuclear Technology Education Consortium (NTEC) The Open University University of Sheffield University of Surrey University of the West of Scotland |
| United States | Air Force Institute of Technology Abilene Christian University Clemson University Colorado School of Mines Georgia Institute of Technology Idaho State University Kansas State University Louisiana State University Massachusetts Institute of Technology Missouri University of Science and Technology North Carolina State University Ohio State University Oregon State University Penn State University Purdue University Rensselaer Polytechnic Institute South Carolina State University Texas A&M University United States Military Academy at West Point University of California, Berkeley University of Florida University of Idaho University of Illinois at Urbana-Champaign University of Maryland University of Massachusetts Lowell University of Michigan University of Missouri University of Nevada, Las Vegas University of New Mexico University of Pittsburgh University of Rhode Island University of South Carolina University of Tennessee University of Texas University of Utah University of Wisconsin-Madison Virginia Commonwealth University Virginia Tech |

== Organizations ==
- American Nuclear Society
- Asian Network for Education in Nuclear Technology (ANENT) https://www.iaea.org/services/networks/anent
- Canadian Nuclear Association
- Chinese Nuclear Society
- International Atomic Energy Agency
- International Energy Agency (IEA)
- Japan Atomic Industrial Forum (JAIF)
- Korea Nuclear Energy Agency (KNEA)
- Latin American Network for Education in Nuclear Technology (LANENT) https://www.iaea.org/services/networks/lanent
- Minerals Council of Australia
- Nucleareurope
- Nuclear Institute
- Nuclear Energy Institute (NEI)
- Nuclear Industry Association of South Africa (NIASA)
- Nuclear Technology Education Consortion https://www.ntec.ac.uk/
- OECD Nuclear Energy Agency (NEA)
- Regional Network for Education and Training in Nuclear Technology (STAR-NET) https://www.iaea.org/services/networks/star-net
- World Nuclear Association
- World Nuclear Transport Institute

== See also ==
- Atomic physics
- Chernobyl nuclear disaster
- Fukushima nuclear disaster
- International Nuclear Event Scale
- List of books about nuclear issues
- Lists of nuclear disasters and radioactive incidents
- List of nuclear science journals
- List of nuclear reactors
- List of nuclear power stations
- Nuclear energy policy
- Nuclear fuel
- Nuclear criticality safety
- Nuclear material
- Nuclear physics
- Nuclear power
- Nuclear reactor technology
- Nuclear renaissance
- Nucleonics
- Safety engineering
- Thermal hydraulics
- Waste Isolation Pilot Plant
