= List of countries by uranium reserves =

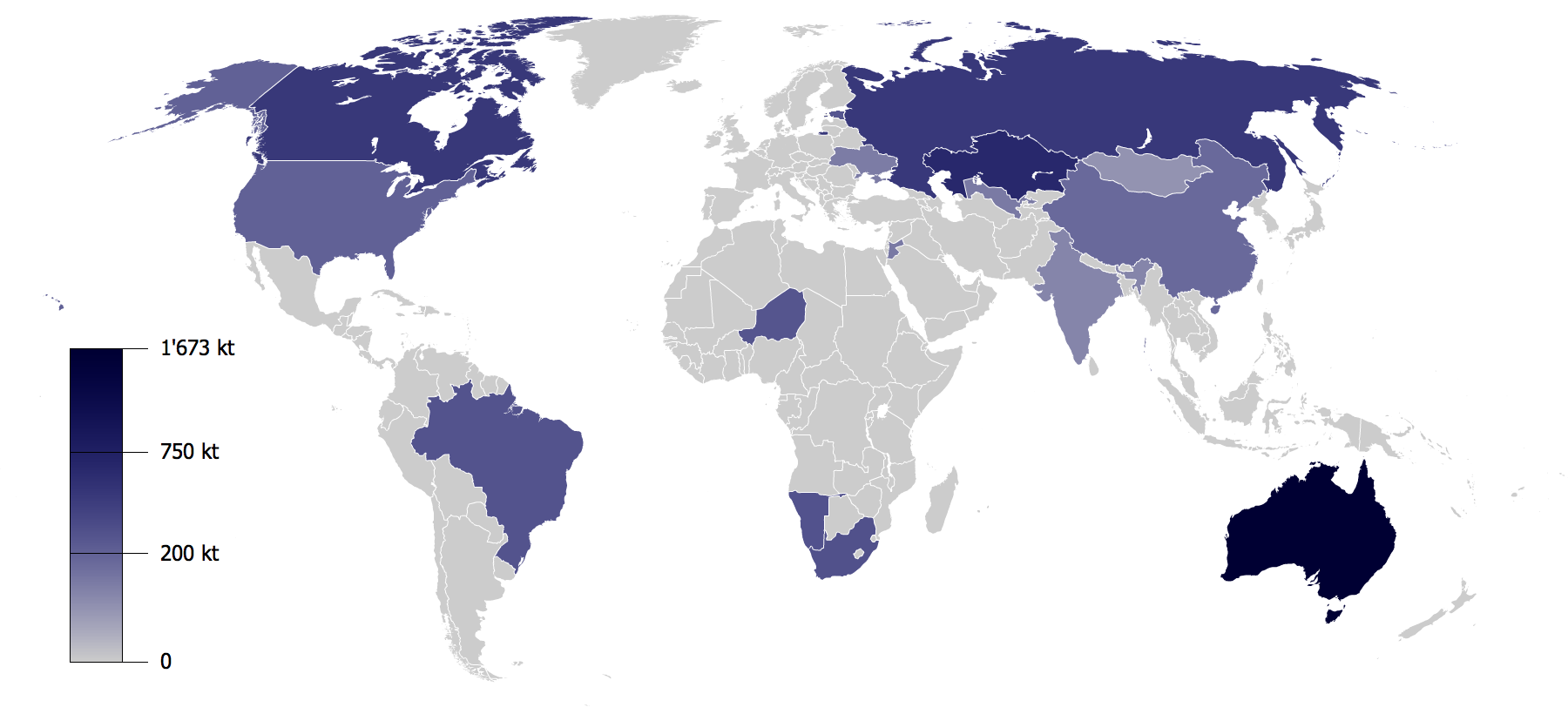
World uranium reserves in 2010

Uranium reserves are reserves of recoverable uranium, regardless of isotope, based on a set market price. The list given here is based on Uranium 2020: Resources, Production and Demand, a joint report by the OECD Nuclear Energy Agency and the International Atomic Energy Agency.

Figures are given in metric tonnes. The reserves figures denote identified resources as of 1 January 2015, consisting of reasonably assured resources (RAR) plus inferred resources recoverable at a cost range of below US$260/kg U. The list also includes cumulative historical production figures.

The amount of ultimately recoverable uranium depends strongly on what one would be willing to pay for it. Uranium is a widely distributed metal with large low-grade deposits that are not currently considered profitable. As of 2015, 646,900 tonnes of reserves are recoverable at US$40 per kilogram of uranium, while 7,641,600 tonnes of reserves are recoverable at $260 per kilogram. Moreover, much of Canada, Greenland, Siberia and Antarctica are currently unexplored due to permafrost and may hold substantial undiscovered reserves. Australia is estimated to have the largest reserves, followed by Kazakhstan, Canada and Russia. However, it is worth noting that Australia does not utilise its reserves, though it mines at Olympic dam.

== List ==
| Country | Continent | Reserves as of 2019 (tonnes) | Historical production to 2014 (tonnes) |
|---|---|---|---|
| Algeria | Africa | 19,500 | 0 |
| Argentina | South America | 39,800 | 2,582 |
| Australia | Australia | 2,049,400 | 194,646 |
| Belgium | Europe | 0 | 686 |
| Botswana | Africa | 87,200 | 0 |
| Brazil | South America | 276,800 | 4,172 |
| Bulgaria | Europe | 19,600 | 16,364 |
| Canada | North America | 873,000 | 483,957 |
| Central African Republic | Africa | 32,000 | 0 |
| Chad | Africa | 2,400 | 0 |
| Chile | South America | 1,400 | 0 |
| China | Asia | 269,700 | 39,849 |
| Democratic Republic of the Congo | Africa | 2,700 | 25,600 |
| Czech Republic | Europe | 119,200 | 111,765 |
| Egypt | Africa | 1,900 | 0 |
| Finland | Europe | 1,200 | 30 |
| France | Europe | 0 | 76,006 |
| Gabon | Africa | 5,800 | 25,403 |
| Germany | Europe | 7,000 | 219,686 |
| Greece | Europe | 20,000 | 0 |
| Denmark (Greenland) | Europe | 114,000 | 0 |
| Hungary | Europe | 13,500 | 21,067 |
| India | Asia | 195,900 | 3000 |
| Indonesia | Asia | 8,400 | 0 |
| Iran | Asia | 7,500 | 0 |
| Italy | Europe | 6,100 | 0 |
| Japan | Asia | 6,600 | 84 |
| Jordan | Asia | 52,500 | 0 |
| Kazakhstan | Asia | 969,200 | 244,707 |
| Madagascar | Africa | 0 | 785 |
| Malawi | Africa | 14,300 | 4,217 |
| Mali | Africa | 8,900 | 0 |
| Mauritania | Africa | 24,500 | 0 |
| Mexico | North America | 5,000 | 49 |
| Mongolia | Asia | 143,500 | 535 |
| Namibia | Africa | 504,200 | 120,418 |
| Niger | Africa | 439,400 | 132,017 |
| Pakistan | Asia | 0 | 1,439 |
| Paraguay | South America | 3,600 | |
| Peru | South America | 33,400 | 0 |
| Poland | Europe | 100,000 | 650 |
| Portugal | Europe | 7,000 | 3,720 |
| Romania | Europe | 6,600 | 18,899 |
| Russia | Asia/Europe | 661,900 | 158,844 |
| Senegal | Africa | 1,100 | |
| Slovakia | Europe | 15,500 | 211 |
| Slovenia | Europe | 9,200 | 382 |
| Somalia | Africa | 7,600 | 0 |
| South Africa | Africa | 447,700 | 159,510 |
| Spain | Europe | 28,500 | 8,028 |
| Sweden | Europe | 9,600 | 200 |
| Tanzania | Africa | 58,200 | 0 |
| Turkey | Asia/Europe | 13,600 | 0 |
| Ukraine | Europe | 186,900 | 129,804 |
| United States | North America | 101,900 | 373,075 |
| Uzbekistan | Asia | 132,300 | 127,591 |
| Vietnam | Asia | 3,900 | 0 |
| Zambia | Africa | 31,000 | 86 |
| Zimbabwe | Africa | 1,400 | 0 |
| Total | | 8,070,400 | 2,818,415 |

Notes: Historical production for the Czech Republic includes 102,241 tonnes of uranium produced in former Czechoslovakia from 1946 through the end of 1992. Historical production for Germany includes 213,380 tonnes produced in the German Democratic Republic from 1946 through the end of 1992. Historical production for the Soviet Union includes the former Soviet Socialist Republics of Estonia, Kyrgyzstan, Tajikistan and Uzbekistan, but excludes Kazakhstan and Ukraine. Historical production for the Russian Federation and Uzbekistan is since 1992 only.

== See also ==
- Uranium mining
- List of countries by uranium production
- Uranium mining by country
