= Mandela Kapere =

Namibian politician

- Born: 4 June 1982
- Died: 7 December 2020 (aged 38)
- Citizenship: Namibian
- Occupation: politician
- Political party: SWAPO

Mandela Kapere (4 June 1982—7 December 2020) was a Namibian politician of the dominant SWAPO party, and a member of parliament until his death.

== Biography ==
Mandela Kapere was the son of SWAPO politician and diplomat Asser Kapere and his wife Maria. He was a member of the National Assembly of Namibia and SWAPO's central committee. Kapere died from COVID-19 at age 38.
