= List of countries by uranium production =

This contains lists of countries by uranium production. The first two lists are compiled by the World Nuclear Association, and measures uranium production by tonnes mined. The last list is compiled by TradeTech, a consulting company which specializes in the nuclear fuel market.

== World Nuclear Association (2022) ==
Country/Region	Uranium production (2022) (tonnes U)	Percentage of World Production (2022)
World	49,355	100.00%
Kazakhstan	21,227	43.01%
Canada	7,351	14.89%
Namibia	5,613	11.37%
Australia	4,553	9.22%
Uzbekistan	3,300	6.69%
Russia	2,508	5.08%
Niger	2,020	4.09%
China	1,700	3.44%
India	600	1.22%
South Africa	200	0.40%
Ukraine	100	0.20%
United States	75	0.15%
Pakistan	45	0.09%
Brazil	43	0.09%
Iran	20	0.04%

== World Nuclear Association (2018) ==
Country/Region	Uranium production (2018) (tonnes U)	Percentage of World Production (2018)
World	53,498	100.00%
Kazakhstan	21,705	40.57%
Canada	7,001	13.09%
Australia	6,517	12.18%
Namibia	5,525	10.33%
Niger	2,911	5.44%
Russia	2,904	5.43%
Uzbekistan	2,404	4.49%
China	1,885	3.52%
Ukraine	1,180	2.21%
United States	582	1.09%
India	308	0.79%
South Africa	346	0.65%
Iran	71	0.13%
Pakistan	45	0.08%

== TradeTech (2011) ==
Country/Region	Uranium Production (2011) (thousands pounds U_{3}O_{8})	Percentage of World Production (2011)
World	139,075	100.00%
Kazakhstan	50,568	36.36%
Canada	23,775	17.10%
Australia	15,555	11.18%
Niger	11,312	8.13%
Namibia	8,470	6.09%
Russia	7,781	5.59%
Uzbekistan	6,499	4.67%
United States	3,996	2.87%
Ukraine	2,314	1.66%
China	2,301	1.65%
Malawi	2,199	1.58%
South Africa	1,513	1.09%
India	1,040	0.75%
Brazil	689	0.50%
Czech Republic	595	0.43%
Romania	200	0.14%
Pakistan	117	0.08%
Germany	52	0.04%
France	16	0.01%

== See also ==
- List of countries by uranium reserves
- Uranium mining by country
- Uranium mining in France
- List of uranium projects
