= Copper in Africa =

Overview of ore deposits and extraction

Copper is one of the world's most important industrial minerals, and Africa is an important world producer. While output is traditionally dominated by Zambia, South Africa and Katanga Province in the south of the Democratic Republic of the Congo, many African nations contribute to copper production, and many African nations have undeveloped ore resources.

Cobalt, another important industrial metal, is often mined in conjunction with copper.

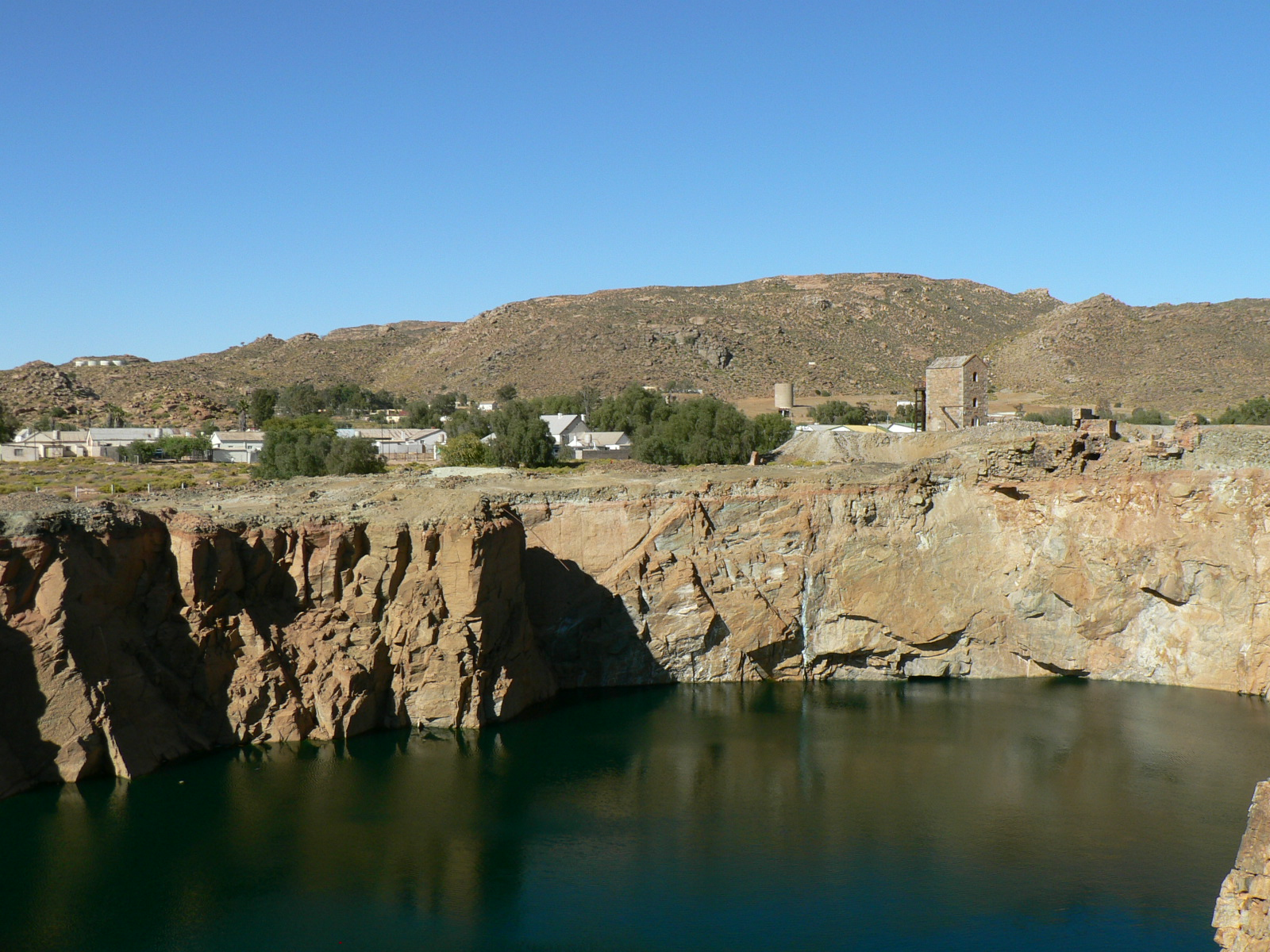
Okiep copper mine, South Africa

== Botswana ==
- Dukwi, African Copper's Mowana mine
- Ghanzi, Hana Mining; also silver.

== Democratic Republic of the Congo ==
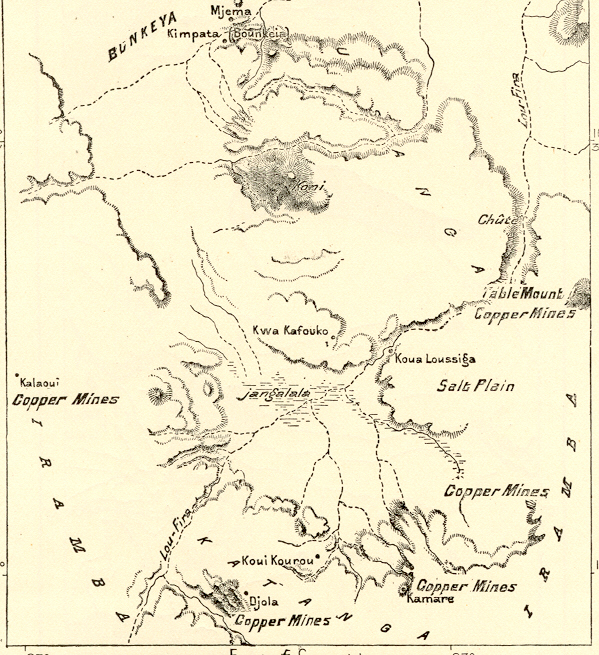
Katanga mining area, 1890s

- Katanga Province

== Namibia ==
- Weatherly (formerly Ongopolo Mining and Processing) – Matchless Mine Western Extension and Otjihase Mine near Windhoek

== South Africa ==
- Palabora Mining Company
- Rio Tinto

== Uganda ==
- Kasese - Kilembe Mines
- Jinja – Kilembe smelting operations currently reopening under A-Tec Mining after 1975 nationalization

== Zambia ==
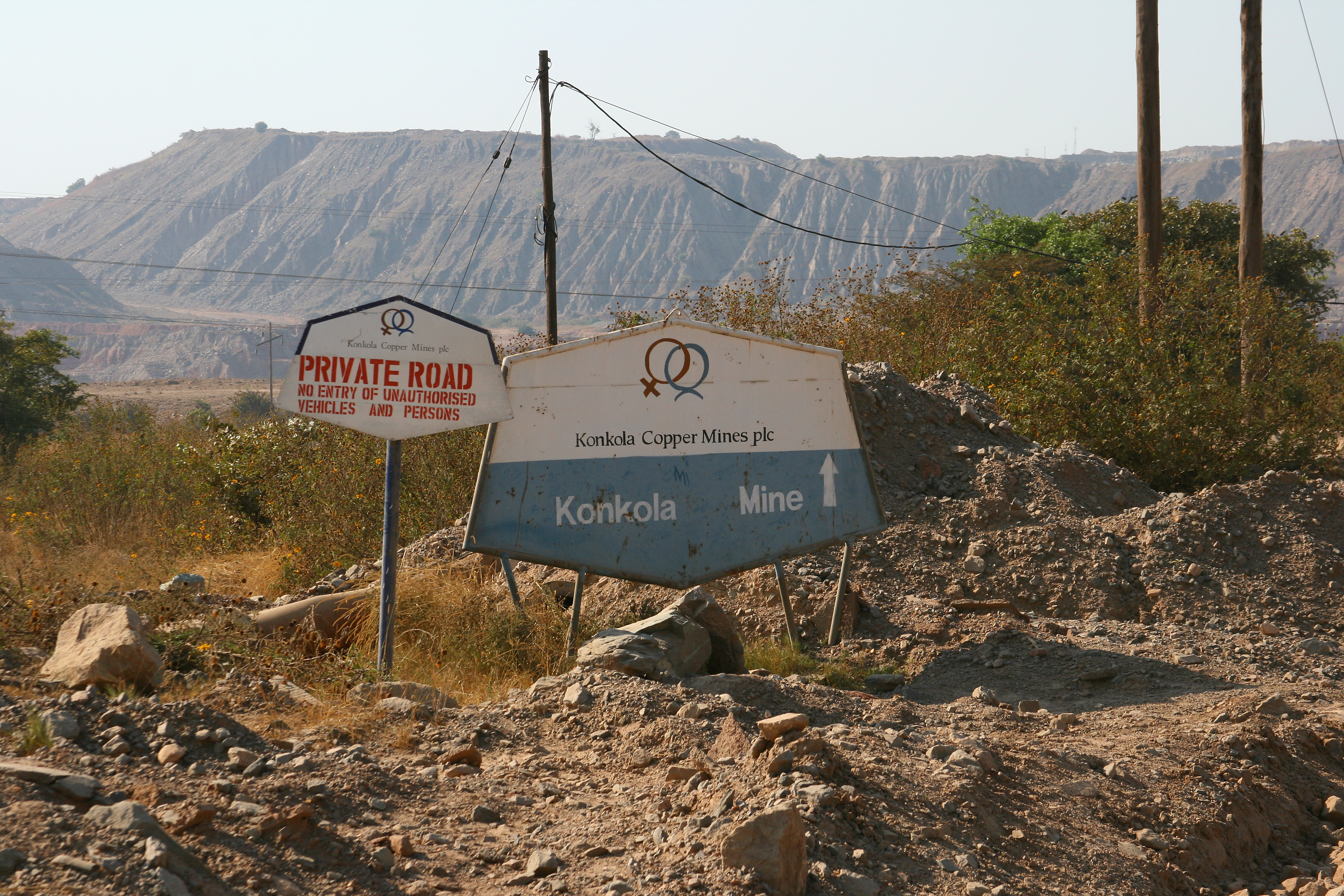
Nchanga copper mine, Zambia

- The Copperbelt
- Copperbelt Province
- Lumwana – Equinox Minerals
- Nchanga Mines
- Luanshya Copper Mine Company – Baluba – Mulyashi copper project
- Mkushi – African Eagle Resources
- Zambia Consolidated Copper Mines
- Zambia Copper Investments Limited – Konkola Deep Mining Project – symbol ZCI on the Johannesburg Securities Exchange

== Tanzania ==
Kinusi copper mine, Tanzania

Marula Mining Plc has 75% commercial interest in 10 primary mining licences through a binding head of agreement with Takela Mining Limited. The Licences are valid for a period of 7 years and are located in Kinusi in Mpwapwa District in the Dodoma Region of central Tanzania.

- Key milestone achieved at the Kinusi mine
- First Copper Sales Agreement Signed for Kinusi Copper Mine

"We are excited about the potential for further expansion and remain committed to developing Kinusi into a key contributor to our growing portfolio of battery and strategic metals projects." - CEO Marula Mining.

== See also ==
- Copper extraction techniques
- List of countries by copper mine production
- Mineral industry of Africa
- Economy of Zambia
- Aluminium in Africa
- Cement in Africa
- Iron ore in Africa
- Platinum in Africa
- Titanium in Africa
