= Fission Uranium Corp. =

Canadian mining company

- Type: Public
- Traded as: TSX: FCU
- Industry: Uranium mining
- Founded: 2013; 13 years ago
- Founder: Dev Randhawa
- Headquarters: Kelowna, British Columbia, Canada
- Key people: Ross E. McElroy; (Chairman and CEO)
- Owner: Paladin Energy (2024–present)
- Number of employees: 39 (2016)
- Website: fissionuranium.com

Fission Uranium Corp. is a mineral exploration company engaged in the exploration and development of uranium assets. Its sole project is the Patterson Lake South (PLS) Project located in Canada's Athabasca Basin District.

On December 23, 2024, it was announced that Paladin Energy had acquired full control of the Canadian company.

== History ==
Fission's history can be traced directly to Strathmore Minerals Corp., a firm founded in 1996 by Dev Randhawa. Under his leadership, Strathmore Minerals spun out Fission Energy Corp in 2008, and time Randhawa left Strathmore to run Fission Energy. Ross McElroy joined Fission Energy and led the company's technical team to its first major discovery: the J Zone at Waterbury Lake in Saskatchewan's Athabasca Basin.

A second discovery, at PLS in the Athabasca Basin, was made in November 2012. In 2013, Fission Uranium Corp. was spun out of Fission Energy b after a deal was made with Denison Mines Corp to acquire all assets except PLS. In January, 2015, Fission Uranium announced a major resource estimate in the indicated and inferred categories which, at that time, was the largest undeveloped resource in the Athabasca Basin region.

In Fall 2015, Fission Uranium became embroiled in a dispute with a small group of dissident shareholders over an attempted merger with Denison Mines Corp. The deal was opposed by some of the company's shareholders, who staged an attempted ‘proxy fight’ The attempt failed and Fission's incumbent board of directors received an overwhelming majority of the shareholder vote

In January 2016, Fission Uranium Corporation entered into an agreement with Hong Kong-based utility subsidiary CGN Mining, which took a 19.9% share in the company and purchased up to 35% of annual production from the Patterson Lake South project for the investment of $82 million at a price of $0.85.

== Operations ==
The PLS project is Fission's core asset and is host to the Triple R deposit, the undeveloped uranium deposit in Canada's Athabasca Basin District. The property consists of around 17 contiguous claims totaling over 30,000 hectares located approximately 550 kilometers north-northwest of the city of Prince Albert and 150 kilometers north of the community of La Loche. The PLS Property is located within the Mid-Boreal Upland Ecoregion of the Boreal Shield Ecozone. In December 2016 the company announced it would conduct a 10,000 metre drill program to test regional targets outside of the Triple R Deposit.

The PLS project is on traditional lands belonging to the Clearwater River Dene Nation, and in 2021, CRDN said they did not support the project.

In February 2017 Fission announced it had expanded near-surface, high-grade uranium zones at each end of its 2.6 kilometer mineralized trend as well as discovered new mineralization located 660 metres from the R840W zone.

In April 2017 Fission reported it had expanded the R1515W zone and in turn extended the mineralized trend at Patterson Lake South to 3.17 kilometers.

== Awards ==
Fission Uranium and its management and technical teams have won a series of awards since its founding. These include: The Northern Miners "Mining Person/s of the Year, 2013", PDAC's "Bill Dennis Award for a Canadian Discovery and Prospecting Success, 2014" and The Mining Journal's "Exploration of the Year, 2015".
