= Crucea – Botușana mine =

Uranium mine in Romania

Crucea - Botușana mine
- Interactive map of Crucea - Botușana mine

Location
- Location: Crucea, Suceava County, Romania

Production
- Products: Uranium
- Production: 46,000 tonnes of uranium ore
- Financial year: 2008

History
- Opened: 1965

Owner
- Company: CNU

The Crucea – Botușana mine is a large mine in the northeast of Romania in Suceava County, 145 km southeast of Suceava and c. 400 km north of the capital, Bucharest. Crucea - Botușana represents the second largest uranium reserve in Romania having estimated reserves of 30 million tonnes of uranium ore grading 0.5% uranium metal thus resulting in 150,000 tonnes of high grade metal.
