= Kurišková mine =

Uranium mine in Košice, Košice Region, Slovakia

Kurišková uranium deposit
- Location: Košice, Košice Region, Slovakia
- Products: Uranium
- Company: European Uranium Resources

The Kurišková uranium deposit is one of the largest uranium deposits in Slovakia. The deposit is located in close neighborhoods (6 km) of the city of Košice in Košice Region in the area known as Jahodná. Since 2006 the deposit has been explored by European Uranium Resources (formerly known as Tournigan Energy) through its local daughter company Ludovika Energy with a prospect of future uranium mining, however, the activity was greeted with resistance of local people. The resistance of local inhabitants against uranium mining near Košice even led to Slovakia's biggest-ever environmental petition supported by Greenpeace, which has been signed by more than 113,000 people and 41 towns and cities all over the country. According to Ludovika Energy, Kurišková has an estimated annual production capacity of over 1.8 million pounds of ore, reserves amounting to 32.55 million pounds of ore grading 0.3865% uranium thus resulting 56.98 tonnes of uranium.
