= Arandis =

Town in the Erongo Region of Namibia

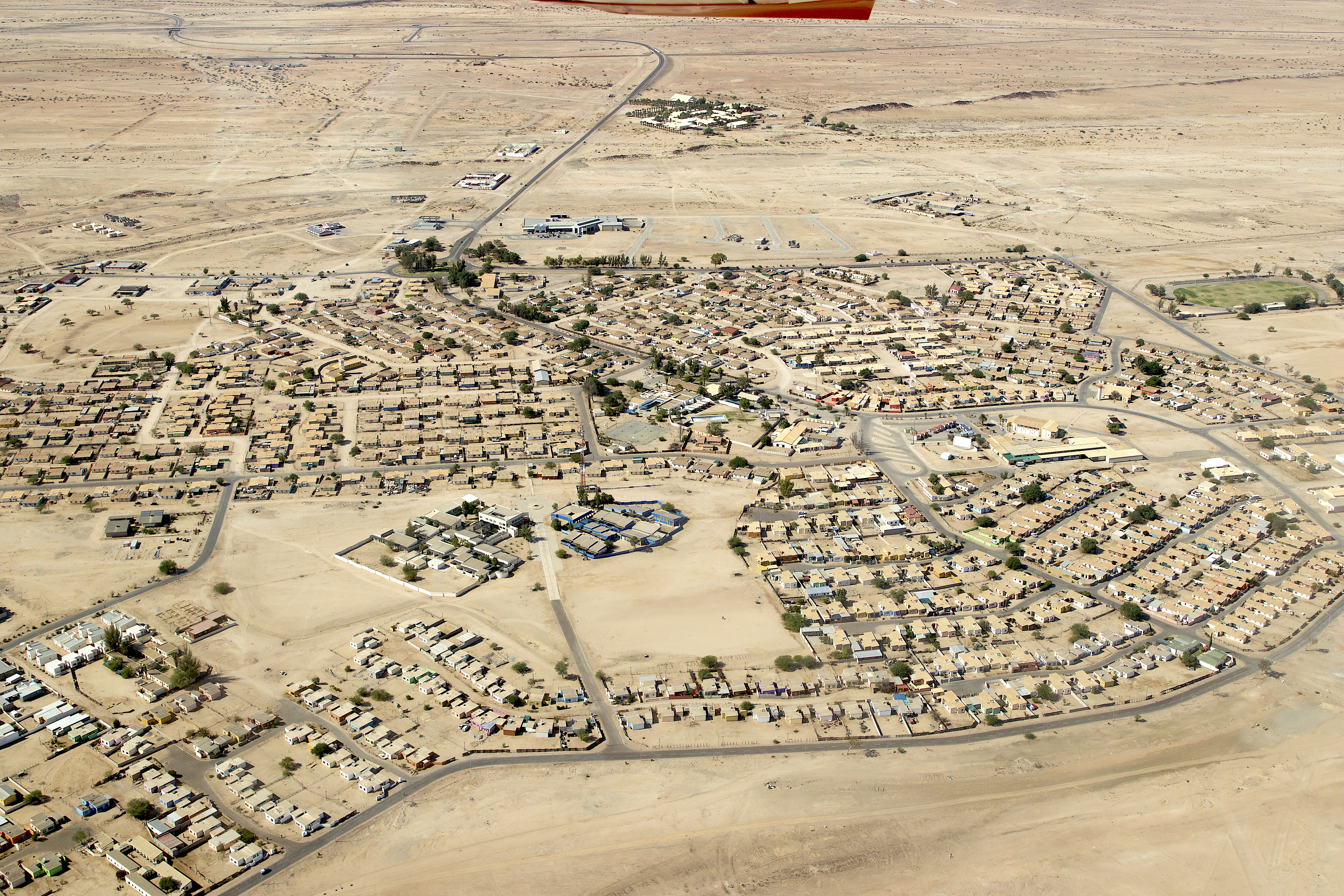

- Location in Namibia
- Coordinates: 22°25′S 14°58′E
- Country: Namibia
- Region: Erongo Region
- Constituency: Arandis Constituency
- Established: 1978; 48 years ago
- Proclaimed town: 1994; 32 years ago

Government
  - Major: Risto Kapenda

Area
  - Total: 12.9 sq mi (33.4 km^{2})
  - Land: 12.9 sq mi (33.4 km^{2})

Population (2023)
  - Total: 5,726
  - Density: 444/sq mi (171/km^{2})
- Time zone: UTC+2 (South African Standard Time)
- Climate: BWh

Arandis (Khoekhoe for 'the place where people cry') is a mining town in the Erongo Region of western central Namibia. The town has 5,726 inhabitants. Originally a camp for workers of the nearby Rössing uranium mine, Arandis was declared a town in 1994.

== Economy and infrastructure ==
Arandis has been called the Uranium Capital of the World as it is located just 15 km outside the world's largest open-pit uranium mine, the Rössing uranium mine. It also serves the Husab and Trekkopje uranium mines. Economic conditions in town have thus always been dependent on the worlds market price of uranium.

Uranium mining operations, in particular during the Rössing mine's early years, have led to allegations of occupational health violations and radiation-related illnesses. A 1993 report from a medical student was dismissed both by the mine and the authorities, further independent research has never been conducted.

The 2000s saw a resurgence in economic growth in Arandis. With the global energy crisis, a significant rise in demand occurred for nuclear energy, increasing demand for Arandis' uranium. Banks, which had previously closed and youth who had previously left the town seeking employment elsewhere, returned. In 2008, negotiations were at an advanced stage for a Chinese company, Namibia Industrial Mining Limited, to build a factory for making building materials in Arandis.

After an investment conference was held in 2011, investors decided to erect a shopping mall in town. Construction of the mall started soon afterwards, the anticipated completion date is May 2013.

=== Transportation ===
Arandis is situated on the B2 national road that connects the central Atlantic coast to Windhoek. The Arandis Railway Station is a crossing loop on the Trans-Namib Railway between Swakopmund and Usakos. Arandis Airport is also nearby.

== History ==
Established for the workers of Rössing Uranium in 1978, Arandis was granted self-administration and town status in 1994. Arandis owns 29 square kilometres (11 sq mi) of land and in 2010 had 7,600 inhabitants, most of whom were somehow connected to the mine.

== Demographics ==
Historical population
Year	Pop.	±% p.a.
2001	3,974	—
2011	5,170	+2.67%
2023	5,726	+0.85%

== Politics ==
Arandis is governed by a town council that has seven seats.

In the first local elections after Namibian independence, the 1992 Namibian local elections, SWAPO won by a landslide. It obtained 1,053 votes and gained six seats. The remaining seat went to the United Democratic Front (UDF) with 122 votes.

In the 2004 local authority elections SWAPO won the town council election with 753 votes and gained four seats. Two seats and 295 votes were obtained by the UDF, and one seat (139 votes) went to the Congress of Democrats (CoD). SWAPO also won the 2010 local authority elections. It received 664 votes. The UDF finished in second place with 243 votes, and the Rally for Democracy and Progress (RDP), an opposition party founded in 2007, received 72 votes. In the 2015 local authority elections SWAPO won again, gaining 5 seats (780 votes). The remaining 2 seats went to the UDF (295 votes).

SWAPO also won the 2020 local authority election but for the first time failed to gain the majority of seats in the town council. SWAPO obtained 551 votes and gained three seats. Runner-up Independent Patriots for Change (IPC, newly formed in August 2020) gained two seats (405 votes), and UDF and Landless People's Movement (LPM) gained one seat each with 230 and 140 votes, respectively. Benitha Imbamba is currently serving as the Arandis Constituency councilor.

== Education ==
In 1991, the Namibian Institute of Mining and Technology (NIMT), a technical institute focusing on training skilled industrial workers, was established.

Kolin Foundation Secondary School and U.B. Dax Primary School are situated in town.

== See also ==
- List of cities and towns in Namibia
- Uranium mining in Namibia
