= Aussinanis project =

Location
- Location: Erongo Region, Namibia

Production
- Products: uranium
- Production: 0

Owner
- Company: Yellow Dune Uranium Resources

The Aussinanis project is a uranium deposit located in the western part of Namibia in Erongo Region. Aussinanis represents a uranium reserve estimated at 34.88 million tonnes of ore grading 0.02% uranium.
