= Arandis Constituency =

Electoral constituency in the Erongo region of eastern central Namibia

Arandis constituency (red) in the Erongo Region

Arandis is a constituency in the Erongo Region of central-eastern Namibia. It had a population of 10,093 in 2011, an increase from 7,590 in 2001. As of 2020, the constituency had 8,888 registered voters.

Arandis Constituency covers 13,519.7 km^{2} (5,220.0 sq mi) of land. It includes the towns of Arandis and Henties Bay, as well as the smaller settlements at Cape Cross and Wlotzkasbaken. Asser Kuveri Kapere, chairman of the National Council of Namibia from 2004 to 2015, has represented the constituency from its establishment in 1992 until 2015.

== Politics ==
Arandis is traditionally a stronghold of the South West Africa People's Organization (SWAPO) party. SWAPO politician Asser Kuveri Kapere has represented the constituency from its establishment in 1992 until 2015. In the 2004 regional election he received 1,473 of the 2,298 votes cast and became councillor. He was subsequently elected to the National Council of Namibia in December 2004 and became its chairman. In the 2010 regional elections, Kapere won the constituency with 1,486 votes. His only challenger was Elijah ǀGawaseb of the United Democratic Front (UDF), who received 1,183 votes. The 2015 regional elections were also won by SWAPO. Benitha Imbamba won with 1,518 votes. ǀGawaseb of UDF came second with 1,071 votes while the independent Andreas Prins received 212 votes.

Imbamba was reelected in the 2020 regional election after receiving 1,213 votes. The other votes were widely distributed over several opposition candidates. Emmanuel Pamwenase Hangula of the Independent Patriots for Change (IPC, an opposition party formed in August 2020) received 825 votes, Daniel Tsaneb of the UDF received 667, Gustav Dlamini of the Rally for Democracy and Progress (RDP) received 595, and Christa Hochobes of the Popular Democratic Movement (PDM) received 571 votes.
