= Husab Mine =

Uranium mine in Namibia

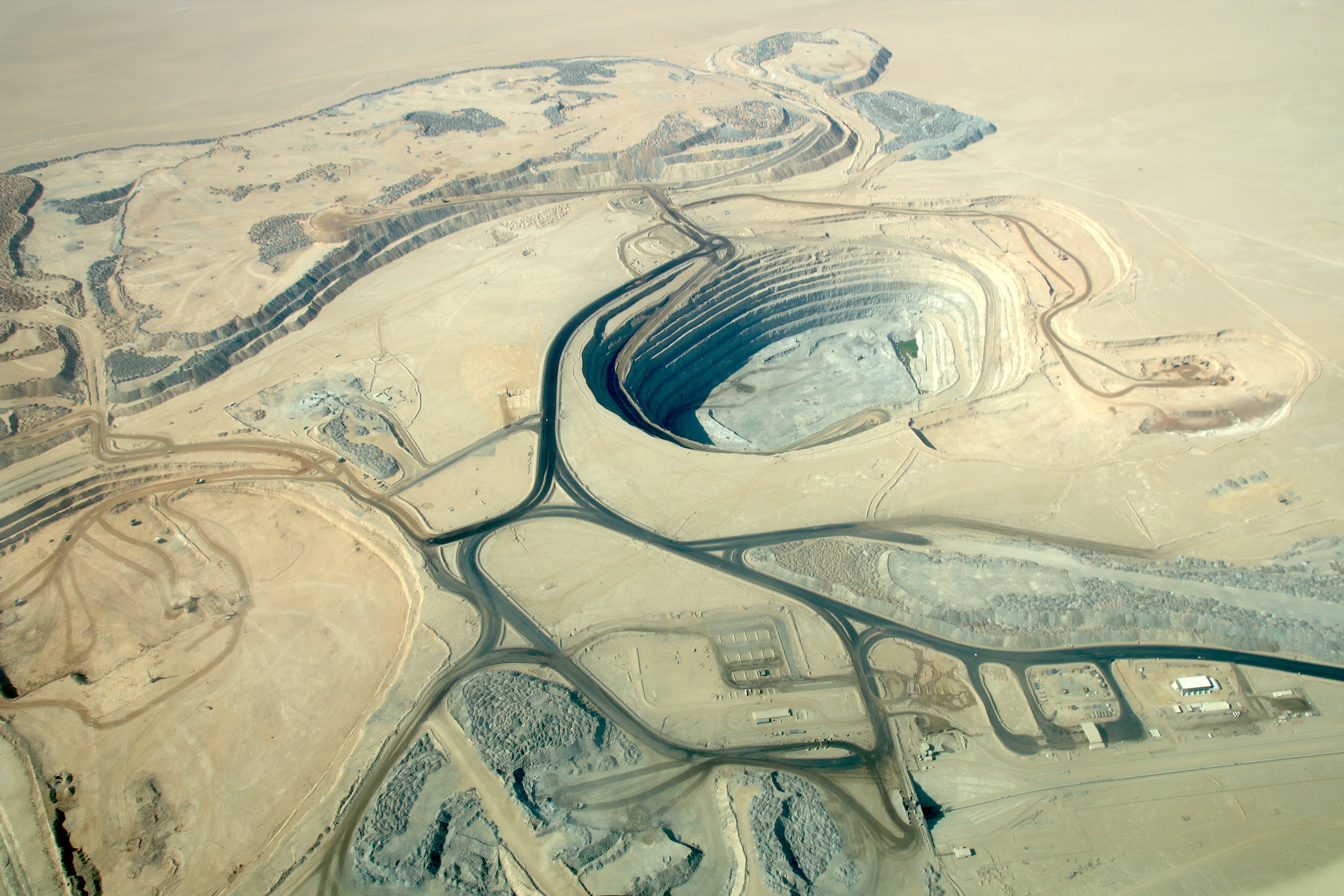
- Northern pit Husab Mine

- Location within Namibia
- Location: Namib Desert, Erongo, Namibia; 22°46′00″S 14°31′00″E
- Products: Uranium
- Type: open pit
- Opened: 2014
- Company: China General Nuclear Power Group, Namibia
- Website: http://www.swakopuranium.com/

The Husab Mine (formerly the Rössing South Mine), operated under the Husab Uranium Project, is a uranium mine near the town of Swakopmund in the Erongo region of western-central Namibia. The mine is located approximately 5 kilometres (3.1 mi) south of the larger Rössing uranium mine and 45 kilometres (28 mi) from Walvis Bay. Swakop Uranium believes the Husab Mine has the potential to become the second largest uranium mine in the world after the McArthur River uranium mine in northern Saskatchewan, Canada and the largest open-pit mine on the African continent. Mine construction started in February 2013. The Husab Mine started production towards the end of 2016 after completion of the sulfuric acid leaching plant.

== Operations ==
On 1 December 2011, the Namibian Ministry of Mines and Energy granted license to Swakop Uranium to develop the mine.

The uranium in the Husab deposit is granite hosted, and currently consists of an administration and housing area and three open pits. The mine has the potential to produce 15 million pounds (6800 tonnes) of uranium oxide per annum. The Husab mine contains approximately 280 million tonnes of uranium ore. Mining is expected to last nearly 20 years.

As of at least 2024, the China-Africa Development Fund and China Guangdong Nuclear Power Uranium Resources Co together own approximately 90% of the mine.

== Geology ==
Uranium mineralisation is hosted primarily within sheeted leucogranites that intrude the rocks at various stages during the Damara Orogeny. Formation of the uranium magmatic ore body is stratigraphically controlled with the Khan-Rossing boundary acting as a redox front. The abundance of iron oxides and sulfides provide reducing conditions for uranium to be oxidised and precipitate in the form of uraninite which is the primary ore mineral that is mined at Husab.

== Swakop Uranium ==
Swakop Uranium is an entity established in 2006 by Extract Resources, an Australian company listed on the Australian, Canadian, and Namibian stock exchanges, to explore, evaluate, develop, and produce uranium oxide. In April 2012, Swakop Uranium was acquired by Taurus Minerals Limited of Hong Kong. Swakop Uranium head office is located in Swakopmund. Taurus is a subsidiary of the China General Nuclear Power Company (CGNPC), Uranium Resources Co. Ltd. and the China-Africa Development Fund. Taurus owns ninety percent of Swakop Uranium. The remaining 10% is owned by Epangelo Mining Company, the Namibian state-owned mining company. CGNPC's investment in Swakop Uranium is one of the biggest investments in Namibia since its independence, and by far the single biggest investment by China in Africa. More than US$100-million (in excess of N$1-billion) was spent to reach the construction phase. A further amount of approximately US$2-billion (more than N$20-billion) was spent to bring the mine online.

== Environment ==
=== Flora and fauna ===
Swakop Uranium has an environmental management plan committed to caring for all species of fauna and flora found near, or within, its exploration and mining areas. Welwitschia mirabilis, an ancient plant, grows in areas around the mine. Carbon dating shows that medium-sized plants can be as old as 1,000 years.

=== Water ===
The Husab Project is challenged to ensure that limited nearby water resources are not adversely affected by mining operations. The Namib Desert is a hyper-arid desert with an average rainfall of between 0–50 mm at Swakopmund and Gobabeb. Long-term records from the Rössing Uranium Mine, situated 5 km north of the Husab mine, show an annual average rainfall of between 30–35 mm per annum.

A hydrogeology report commissioned by Swakop Uranium concluded that the mining activities will have an effect on water levels. Although there are no farmers or settlements in the area, Swakop Uranium has drilled a number of groundwater monitoring holes around the pit, the waste rock dump, the tailings storage facility, the Welwitschia fields as well as the Khan and Swakop Rivers to measure the effect of mining activities in the area. All the boreholes have their water levels measured monthly and strategic boreholes are sampled every three months for water quality.

=== Air quality ===
In order to reduce the dust produced by mining operations to acceptable levels, the Husab mine will employ a number of dust suppression methods such as using water, extraction fans, chemicals, and other suppressants. A dust suppressant will be used on the pit, dump haul roads and other gravel site roads. The use of alternative suppression techniques has the potential to save up to 90% of the water that would otherwise have been required to achieve the same level of control.

== Community ==
Swakop Uranium plans to engage in local procurement and recruitment where possible. The company grants bursaries for promising Namibian university students on an annual basis and has funded the construction of a new school. The company has also established a trust, called the Swakop Uranium Foundation Trust that will focus on training and education, the environment, infrastructure, health, and entrepreneurial development. The trust has donated N$100,000 to the Namibian government's Drought Relief fund.

== Safety ==
Swakop Uranium has instituted a radiation management plan. This plan has been submitted to the National Radiation Protection Authority and is regularly audited to ensure compliance.

== Related deposits ==
There are four related deposits in the granite of the Damara Belt in the Erongo Region of western Namibia, namely at Rössing (SJ and Z20 deposits), the Ida Dome, at Goanikontes, and the Valencia. The Husab Uranium Project includes the Ida Dome 20 km south, with 9600 tU inferred resource at 0.02% (contiguous with Reptile's Ongalo). Ida Dome has estimated reserves of 53 million tonnes of ore grading 0.018% uranium. The Valencia deposit has 2,731 t U proven reserves and 23,577 t U probable reserves, and at Goanikontes there are 3,187 t U proven reserves and 20,055 t U probable reserves. The scope of the SJ and Z20 deposits at Rössing have not been significantly proved.

== See also ==
- Uranium mining
- Uranium mining in Namibia
- Mining in Namibia
- Radium
- Uranium
- Radioactivity
