= Langer Heinrich Mine =

Uranium mine in Erongo Region, Namibia

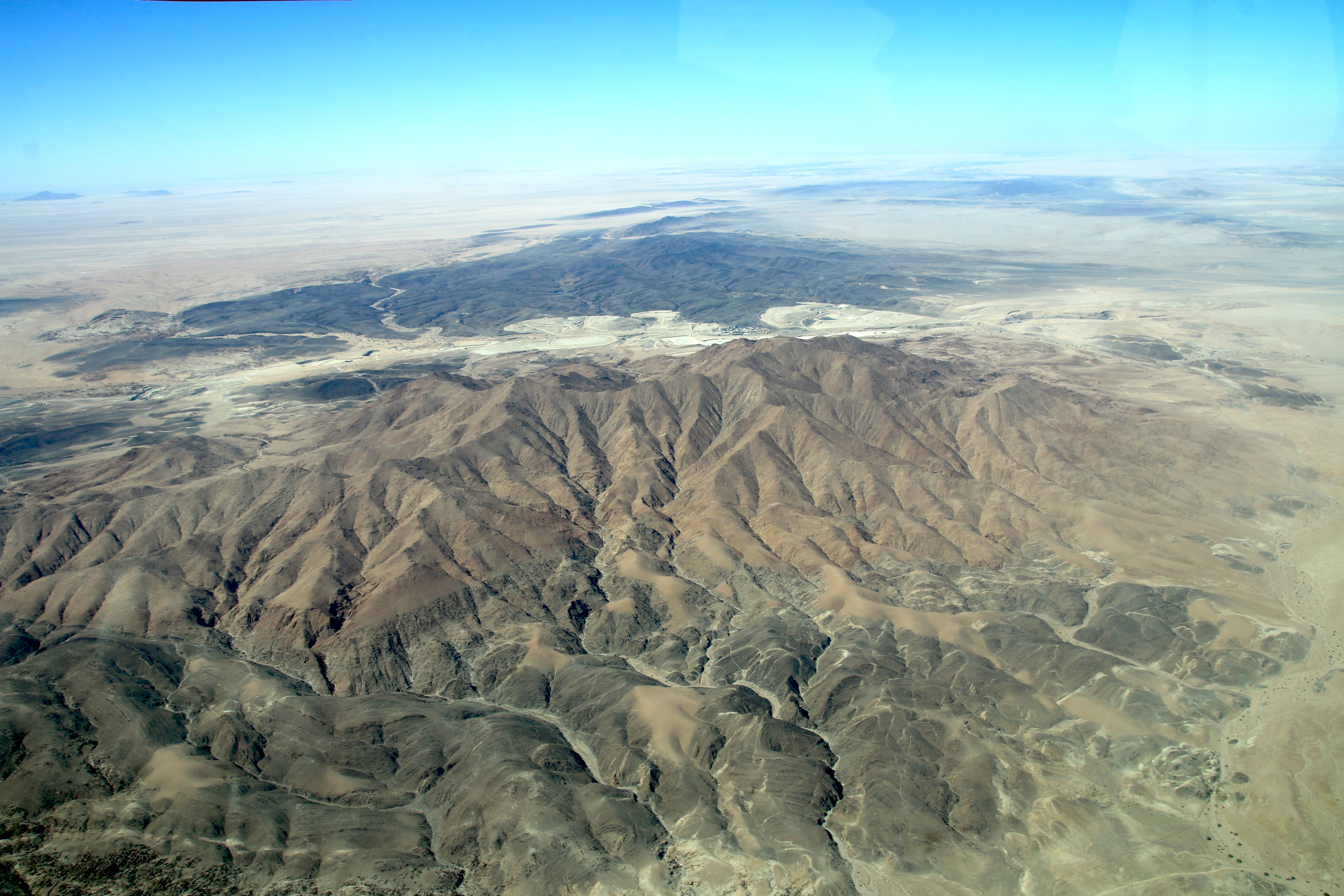
- Langer Heinrich Mountain and beyond the uranium mine seen from 2000 m altitude. (2018)

- Location in Namibia
- Location: Erongo Region, Namibia; 22°48′52.9194″S 15°20′1.68″E
- Products: Uranium
- Opened: 2006
- Company: Paladin Energy Ltd
- Website: www.paladinenergy.com.au/langer-heinrich-namibia-background
- Acquired: 2002

The Langer Heinrich Mine (LHM) is a large open pit mine located in the western part of Namibia in the Erongo Region. Langer Heinrich represents one of the largest uranium reserves in Namibia having estimated reserves of 57,000 tonnes of ore grading 0.055% uranium. The Langer Heinrich Mine is currently owned by Paladin Energy Ltd with a 75% stake and CNNC Overseas Uranium Holding Ltd with a 25% stake. Paladin Energy sold the 25% to the Chinese National Nuclear Corporation (CNNC) in 2014 for a reported $190 million. The mine is under care and maintenance since 2018.

== History ==
The uranium deposit was discovered at the Langer Heinrich Mine in 1973, however the mine only commenced uranium mining operations in 2007 after the mine had been unused for nearly 7 years.

=== Development ===
In 2008, Paladin Energy announced that the Langer Heinrich Mine had achieved its production target for December 2007. In 2008 though, two incidents occurred that halted production: The open pit was flooded with runoff rainwater rendering it unusable for over a month. The second was an electrical accident injuring three people.

In August 2008, Paladin announced an increase or 64% in Inferred Resources and 46% increase in the Measured and Indicated Resources of the Langer Heinrich Mine.

In June 2009, Paladin announced the approval of the Stage III Expansion of the mine which was forecast to increase production capacity to 5.2 million lb U_{3}O_{8} [2000 t U] per year, a reduction on previous forecasts. In October 2009, the company announced a Stage 4 Expansion forecasting production to increase to 10 million lb U_{3}O_{8} [3,846 t U] per year using heap leaching.

In 2010 Paladin Energy announced the sale of uranium to China would start in 2011 after signing an agreement with China Guangdong Nuclear Power Group Co. In 2011, Stage III Expansion was halted due to a miners strike by 600 workers. This was followed by another strike in 2013 by 300 mine workers.

In 2013, mines across Namibia faced an uncertain future due to a lack of water needed for mine operations due to a widespread drought in the region. In 2014, the sale of 25% of the mine was concluded with Chinese National Nuclear Corporation (CNNC). In the same year, Paladin Energy announced that Stage 4 Expansion would be halted due to the weakened price of uranium. In 2015, further cost-reduction projects were put in place by Paladin Energy. The Prime Minister of Namibia released a report on the state of the mine addressing safety concerns and working conditions. In July 2016, Paladin announced the sale of a further 24% of the Langer Heinrich Mine to CNNC to cover mounting debts, bringing the total ownership by the Chinese owned company to 49%.

In May 2018, Paladin confirmed that the mine would cease operations and would be placed into care and maintenance. It was still in this state in 2021, awaiting higher uranium prices.
