= Paladin Energy =

Uranium company based in Western Australia

- Type: Public company
- Traded as: ASX: PDN; TSX: PDN
- Industry: Energy, mining
- Founded: 1993
- Headquarters: Perth, Western Australia
- Key people: Paul Hemburrow, MD & CEO
- Products: Uranium
- Revenue: US$304.4 million (FY2026)
- Number of employees: 549
- Website: www.paladinenergy.com.au

Paladin Energy Ltd is a Western Australian uranium mining company.

It currently has one operating mine in Africa; the Langer Heinrich Mine in Namibia and a significant development project at Patterson Lake South in Saskatchewan, Canada. Paladin is listed on the Australian, Toronto, OTC and Namibian Stock Exchanges. It also owns additional deposits in Labrador, Canada and in Western Australia and Queensland.

== History ==
In 2002 Paladin Energy acquired Langer Heinrich Uranium and its assets from Aztec Resources Ltd. In 2007, following a period of mine and plant construction, Paladin commenced production at the newly completed Langer Heinrich Mine, which had an initial production capacity of 2.7Mlb per annum.

The capacity of the Langer Heinrich Mine was later successfully expanded to a potential production rate of 5.2Mlb per annum by 2012.

In February 2009, Paladin completed the takeover of Fusion Resources in Australia, adding the Duke Batman and Honey Pot deposits to the existing Mount Isa project area.

In 2014, Paladin completed the sale process for a 25% interest in the Langer Heinrich Mine to China Nuclear Corporation (CNNC), which has continued to retain its ownership of the asset.

In November 2014, production was suspended at Langer Heinrich Mine with the operation formally entering a period of care and maintenance in 2018.

Founder of Paladin, John Borshoff stepped down as CEO in 2015, while Alexander Molyneux took over as interim CEO of the company. In 2016, The Australian reported that Paladin may be in talks with Russian owned ARMZ Uranium Holding as well as CNNC.

In 2016, Paladin announced the sale of non-core Australian exploration assets to Uranium Africa. The value of the sale was A$2.5 million and included the Oobagoma project in Western Australia and Pamela/Angela project in the Northern Territory.

On 18 August 2017, Paladin filed for insolvency, due to its high debt and consistently low uranium prices. The stock was also delisted from the Toronto Stock Exchange. To pay its debt, Paladin made a debt-for-equity swap on 2 February 2018, with 98% of its shares being transferred to its creditors. Its shares were subsequently reinstated for trading on the Australian Securities Exchange on 16 February 2018.

In June 2018, former Newcrest executive Scott Sullivan was appointed to take over the CEO responsibilities from Alexander Molyneux. Subsequent CEO's were Ian Purdy appointed in 2020 and current MD and CEO Paul Hemburrow appointed in September 2025.

On 19 July 2022 Paladin announced plans to restart operations at Langer Heinrich Mine with first production being planned for 2024.

On 24 June 2024, Paladin Energy announced a deal to purchase a Canadian mining development company, Fission Uranium Corp., for $1.14 billion. On 18 December, the Canadian federal government approved the deal after conducting a national security review under the Investment Canada Act. The deal was completed on 23 December 2024.

In July 2026, Paladin announced that it had successfully returned the Langer Heinrich Mine to full production and achieved the top end of its guidance range with 4.82Mlb uranium produced for the 2026 financial year.

== Uranium projects ==
The company's uranium projects include Langer Heinrich Mine in Namibia, the Patterson Lake South and Michelin Project in Canada, and Manyingee and Mt Isa advanced exploration projects in Australia. Each of these projects is in different stages of development ranging from mining operations through to current development and exploration

== African focus ==
=== Namibia ===
Paladin's Board approved the development proposal for the Langer Heinrich Mine at a capital cost of US$92M in 2005; site works began in September 2005;and, the project construction was completed on time and within budget. The mine was officially opened by the President of the Republic of Namibia in March 2007.

The Langer Heinrich Mine ceased production in November 2016 during a period of low uranium prices and formally entered a period of care and maintenance that ended in early 2024 after production recommenced following a re-start project that involved a significant revamp of operations. Full production at the site was achieved by the end of the 2026 financial year, with 4.82 Mlb of uranium produced during that financial year.

In 2014, Paladin suspended production at its Kayelekera in Malawi, citing lowered uranium prices at the reason for suspension. In 2020, Paladin completed the sale of Kayelekera to Lotus Resources Ltd with the operations remaining on care and maintenance

== Canada ==
In 2024, Paladin completed the acquisition in Canada of TSX-listed Fission Uranium Corp. after obtaining federal approval under the Investment Canada Act (ICA). As a result of the acquisition Paladin relisted on the TSX. The acquisition delivered Paladin ownership of the advanced uranium development project at Patterson Lake South (PLS) to complement its existing ownership of the Michelin Project in Labrador. In Canada the company operates as Paladin Canada, with its headquarters in the mining centre of Saskatoon, Saskatchewan, which is the closest major city to the PLS Project site.

In early 2025, the Canadian federal Government also granted a Non-Resident Ownership Policy (NROP) exemption for the PLS Project, which mirrored a previous exemption granted for the Michelin Project in Labrador that was granted in 2015. The NROP decision by the Canadian federal government exempts Paladin from the regulations on foreign ownership of current and future producing mines in Canada. Paladin was granted the right to have a majority ownership stake in the Michelin Project after demonstrating that no suitable Canadian owned company was attracted to the venture.

== Australian uranium mining ban ==
Uranium mining bans in Western Australia and Queensland currently restrict Paladin's operating activities in Australia. In Queensland, this ban was overturned in October 2012, allowing Paladin to return to mining. Exploration had not been prohibited.

In 2015, the Government of Queensland reinstated the ban on all uranium mining activity. In Western Australia a ban on uranium mining was reintroduced in 2017 after a short period when mining had been encouraged. Mining is also banned in New South Wales, Victoria and Tasmania. Uranium mining is permitted in South Australia.

In Queensland, Paladin owns the Mt Isa Advanced Exploration Project comprising the Valhalla deposit with both measured and indicated uranium resources of 24,425tU. In Western Australia, the company owns the Manyingee Advanced Exploration Project comprising three mining and two exploration licences.

== Corporate Governance ==
Board of Directors

- Cliff Lawrenson – Chairman – Non-executive (Corporate)
- Paul Hemburrow – Managing Director and CEO (Commercial / Mining)
- Lesley Adams – Director – Non-executive (Corporate Affairs)
- Michele Buchignani – Director – Non-executive (Commercial)
- Jon Hronsky – Director – Non-executive (Technical)
- Peter Main – Director – Non-executive (Finance)
- Anne Templeman-Jones – Director – Non-executive (Finance)
- Peter Watson – Director – Non-executive (Technical)

Executive Leadership Team

- Paul Hemburrow - Managing Director and CEO
- Alex Rybak – Chief Commercial Officer
- Scott Barber - Chief Operating Officer
- Anna Sudlow – Chief Financial Officer
- Melanie Williams – Chief Legal Officer and Company Secretary
- Soolim Carney - Chief Corporate Services and Sustainability Officer
