= Titanium in Africa =

Overview of ore deposits and extraction

Titanium mining in Africa has been beset by environmental problems due to the polluting nature of processing rutile, a principal titanium ore. The extraction and refinement of rutile often lead to the release of heavy metals and other contaminants, impacting soil, water, and air quality.
